= List of Tesla factories =

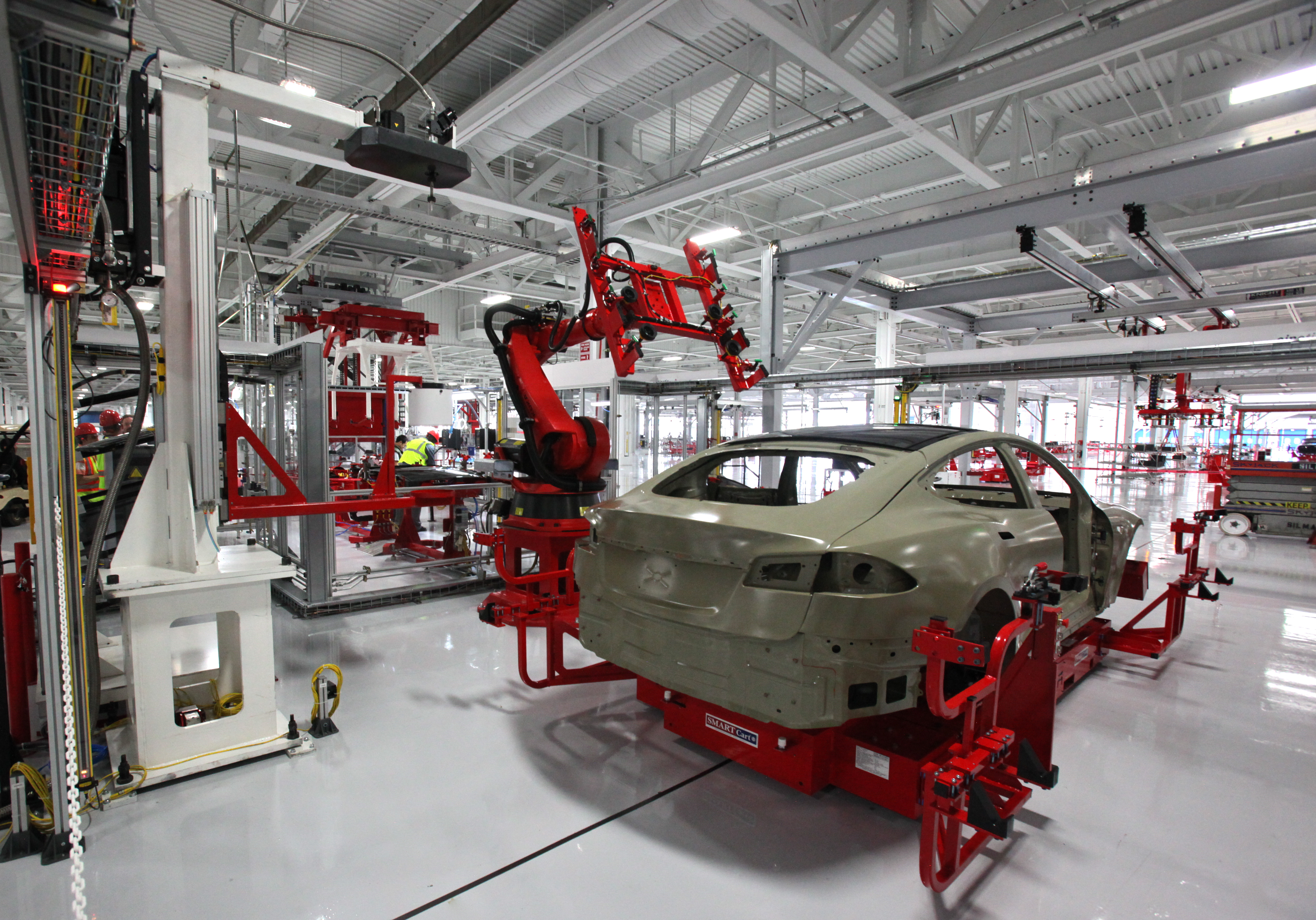
Robotic manufacturing of the Model S at the Tesla Factory in Fremont, California

Tesla, Inc. manufactures their products worldwide and also operates a lithium ore refinery. The following is a list of current, future, and former facilities.

== Current production facilities ==
Locations of all current Tesla factories and production facilities worldwide (as of 07/2026). Each red marker represents one individual facility.

Name	City	Country	Products	Opened/ Acquired	Employees	Floor Area	VIN Code (Note: The eleventh character of the vehicle identification number (VIN) indicates the factory the car has been built in. "R" in the eleventh character of the VIN denotes a "Research" vehicle with no specific factory.)	Comments
Fremont Factory	Fremont, California	United States	Model S (2012-2026); Model X (2015-2026); Model 3; Model Y; Optimus (future); Roadster Gen. 2 (future)	2010	22,000	5,500,000 sq ft (510,000 m^{2})	F	Former GM Fremont Assembly and Toyota/GM NUMMI plant.
Tesla facilities in Tilburg	Tilburg	Netherlands	Automotive parts	2013	540	1,688,217 sq ft (156,840.5 m^{2})	—	Knock-down kit assembly site for Model S & X until 2021. Location reconfigured to manufacture parts.
Tesla Lathrop	Lathrop, California	United States	Automotive parts	2014		885,867 sq ft (82,299.7 m^{2})	—	Former Chrysler parts distribution building. Facility supports the Tesla Fremont Factory and hosts some suppliers.
Kato Facility	Fremont, California	United States	Lithium-ion batteries; Pilot product production	2015		506,409 ft^{2} (47,046.9 m^{2})	—	Former SolarCity facility. 4680 battery "pilot factory" with annual capacity of 10 GWh.
Tesla Tool and Die	Grand Rapids, Michigan	United States	Tool and die casting equipment	2015	100	176,606 ft^{2} (16,407.2 m^{2})	—	Former Riviera Tool and Die factory.
Gigafactory 1 Nevada	Storey County, Nevada	United States	Lithium-ion batteries; Electric motors; Powerwall; Tesla Semi	2016	7,000	5,400,000 sq ft (500,000 m^{2})	N	Annual battery capacity of up to 35 GWh.
Gigafactory 2 New York	Buffalo, New York	United States	Solar Roof; Supercharger	2017	1,500	1,200,000 sq ft (110,000 m^{2})	—	Former SolarCity facility. Location serves as base for autopilot labeling.
Tesla Automation	Prüm	Germany	Manufacturing equipment	2017	800		—	Former Grohmann Automation facility.
Tesla Automation	Neutraubling	Germany	Manufacturing equipment	2017	100		—	Former Grohmann Automation branch location.
Tesla Automation	Neuwied	Germany	Manufacturing equipment	2020	210		—	Former Assembly & Test Europe factory. Manufactures transmission and battery assembly lines.
Tesla Automation	Reutlingen	Germany	Manufacturing equipment	2025	300		—	Former production and research site of Manz
Tesla Brooklyn Park	Brooklyn Park, Minnesota	United States	Manufacturing equipment	2017	150	125,560 sq ft (11,665 m^{2})	—	Former Perbix Machine Company factory.
Tesla Elgin	Elgin, Illinois	United States	Manufacturing equipment	2017			—	Former Compass Automation factory. Produced and development of automated assembly and inspection systems.
Tesla Toronto Automation	Richmond Hill, Ontario	Canada	Battery manufacturing equipment	2019	150		—	Former Hibar Systems facility.
Tesla Toronto Automation	Markham, Ontario	Canada	Battery manufacturing equipment	2021		110,000 ft^{2} (10,000 m^{2})	—	Former Hibar Systems branch location.
Gigafactory 3 Shanghai	Shanghai	China	Model 3; Model Y	2019	20,000	4,500,000 ft^{2} (418,000 m^{2})	C	
Tesla Shanghai Supercharger Factory	Shanghai	China	Supercharger	2021		54,000 ft^{2} (5,000 m^{2})	—	Annual production of 10,000 chargers.
Gigafactory 4 Berlin-Brandenburg	Grünheide	Germany	Model Y; Lithium-ion batteries (future); Cybercab (future)	2022	12,000	2,240,000 ft^{2} (208,000 m^{2})	B	
Gigafactory 5 Texas	Austin, Texas	United States	Model Y; Cybertruck; Cybercab; Optimus (future); Next-gen vehicle (future)	2022	20,000	10,000,000 sq ft (930,000 m^{2})	A	Also serves as Tesla HQ.
Megafactory Lathrop	Lathrop, California	United States	Megapack	2022	1,000	440,538 sq ft (40,927.3 m^{2})	—	Former JCPenney distribution center.
Fremont battery factory	Fremont, California	United States	Lithium-ion batteries	2023		210,000 sq ft (20,000 m^{2})	—	Supports Kato Facility.
Tesla Lithium	Robstown, Texas	United States	Battery-grade lithium hydroxide	2024	250		—	Lithium refinery with estimated annual material capacity for 50 GWh of batteries.
Megafactory Shanghai	Shanghai	China	Megapack	2025		656,000 sq ft (60,900 m^{2})	—	Estimated annual production of 10,000 Megapacks.
Megafactory Texas	Brookshire, Texas	United States	Megapack	2026	1,500	1,600,000 sq ft (150,000 m^{2})	—	Tesla has held the lease on the building since October 2021.

== Planned production facilities ==
Name	City	Country	Products	Expected Opening	Employees	Floor Area	Comments
Cell factory at Megafactory Nevada	Storey County, Nevada	United States	Prismatic LFP cells for Megapack	2027			10 GWh/year capacity when ramped up
Project Crystal Sun	Fort Bend County, Texas	United States	Solar modules	2029	9,712		Earthworks began in November 2026.
Project Crystal Sun	Nueces County, Texas	United States	Polysilicon	2030	515		
Terafab	Grimes County, Texas	United States	Semiconductors	2030	1,800	11,000,000 sq ft (1,000,000 m^{2})	Terafab is a planned semiconductor fabrication plant jointly developed by Tesla and SpaceX.
Gigafactory Mexico	Monterrey, Nuevo Leon	Mexico	Next-gen vehicle	Indefinitely paused	10,000		

== Former production facilities ==
Name	City	Country	Products	In use	Employees	VIN Code	Comments
Tesla Menlo Park	Menlo Park, California	United States	Roadster (1st gen)	2008–2012		1	Former Chevrolet dealership. Final assembly of gliders manufactured at Lotus Cars in Hethel. Location closed and land was converted to mixed-used development by 2022.
Lotus Cars	Hethel	United Kingdom	Roadster (1st gen)	2008–2012		3	Built gliders under contract for assembly in Menlo Park, complete assembly of vehicles for European distribution.
Tesla Palo Alto Facility	Palo Alto, California	United States	Model S (alpha build); Powertrain components	2010–2016	650	P	Initial Model S cars built at the facility in 2010. From 2010 to 2016, supplied powertrains for Tesla and other automakers. Location served as Tesla HQ from 2010 to 2021. Location remains active for other uses.

Note: Maxwell Technologies was acquired by Tesla in 2019 for their battery technology. Maxwell continued to operate as subsidiary until 2021. Due to the short holding time and no known products produced under Tesla, their production facilities are not listed above.
