= Elon Musk and trade unions =

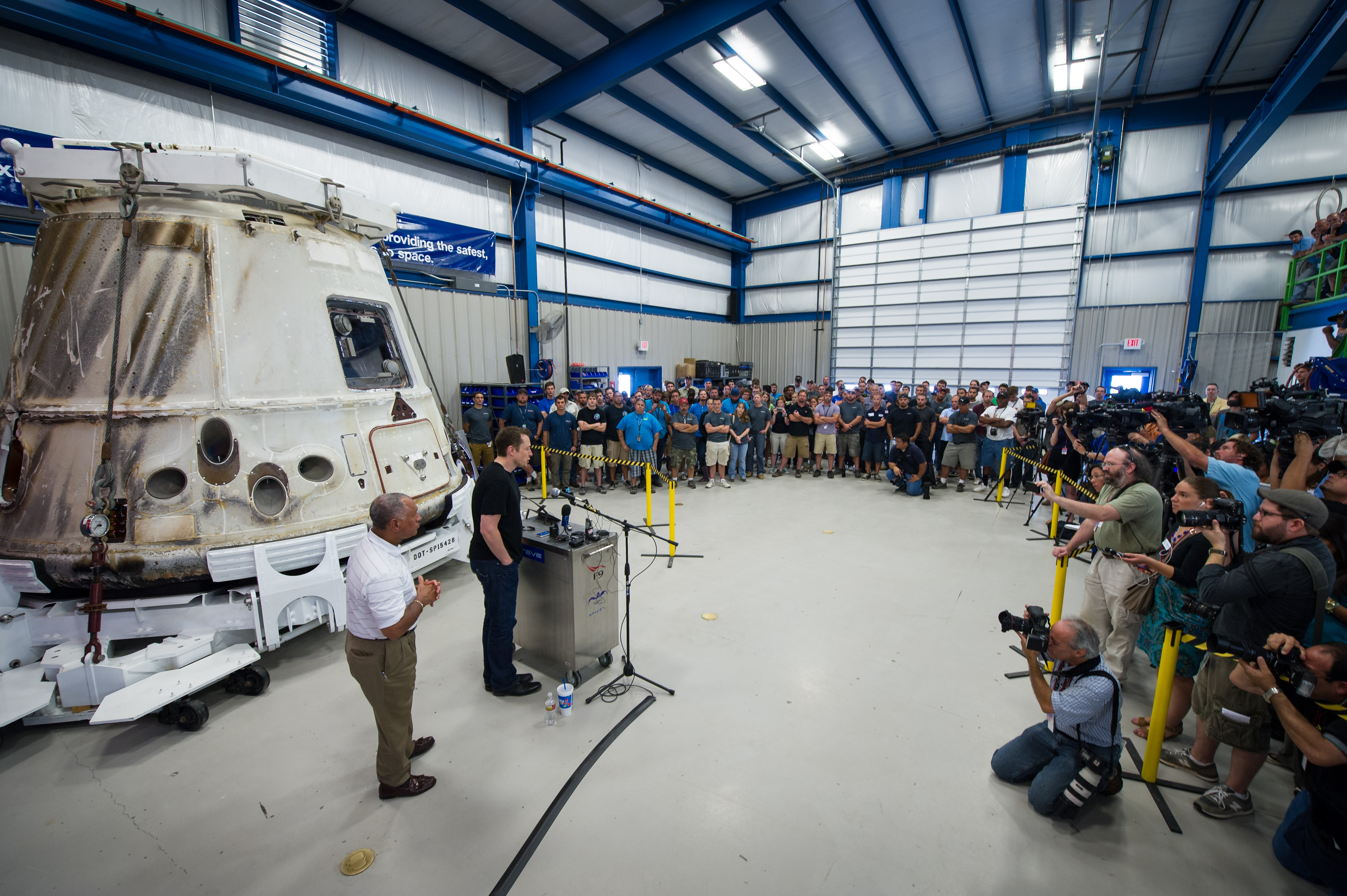
Elon Musk speaking with SpaceX employees following the SpaceX COTS Demo Flight 2

Elon Musk has commented negatively on trade unions and has clashed with workers at companies he owns including Tesla, SpaceX, and X Corp. (formerly Twitter). In 2025, Musk was appointed by President Donald Trump to head the Department of Government Efficiency, which was opposed by several trade unions. In 2023, Musk commented that he disagreed with "the idea of unions", describing it as a "lords and peasants" scenario.

== Investigations and lawsuits ==
The National Labor Relations Board (NLRB) had 24 open investigations into Musk's companies Tesla, SpaceX, and X Corp. (formerly Twitter) as of January 2025. These include alleged surveillance of Twitter employees during Musk's acquisition of Twitter and interference with union organizing at Tesla. The Equal Employment Opportunity Commission was investigating racial discrimination at SpaceX. In 2024, SpaceX counter-sued the NLRB in response to the NLRB's investigation into alleged retaliation against employees who spoke out critically. Two years later, the NLRB dismissed the complaint against SpaceX, arguing that the National Mediation Board, which regulates labor disputes at airlines or airline-like companies has jurisdiction, not the NLRB. Companies covered under the National Mediation Board have fewer workplace protections compared to the NLRB.

In the first month of Donald Trump's second presidency, Trump fired top board members at several labor agencies, including the National Labor Relations Board, the Equal Employment Opportunity Commission and the Federal Labor Relations Authority, denying these independent agencies the quorum needed to make board decisions.

A coalition of US labor unions sued to limit the access of the Department of Government Efficiency (led by Elon Musk) to sensitive data in various government agencies. The AFL-CIO launched a campaign called the Department of People Who Work for a Living, a reference to DOGE.

Two labor unions representing government employees, American Federation of Government Employees, the Service Employees International Union, and the Alliance for Retired Americans, a non-profit representing retired union members, sued the Treasury Department on February 3, for sharing financial information with DOGE, as violations of the Privacy Act and the Internal Revenue Code.

The AFL-CIO sued the Department of Labor on February 5, to prevent DOGE from accessing its internal IT system, a request that was declined by US District Judge John Bates two days later, because the AFL-CIO failed to show actual harm from the Department of Labor.

The American Federation of Teachers, and three more unions, the National Active and Retired Federal Employees Association, the International Association of Machinists and Aerospace Workers, and the National Federation of Federal Employees sued three government agencies on February 10, for allegedly sharing data with the DOGE, including the Treasury Department for sharing tax refunds and social security information, the Office of Personnel Management (the federal government's HR system) for providing job applicant and federal employee data, and the Education Department for providing database of student loans.

== Tesla ==
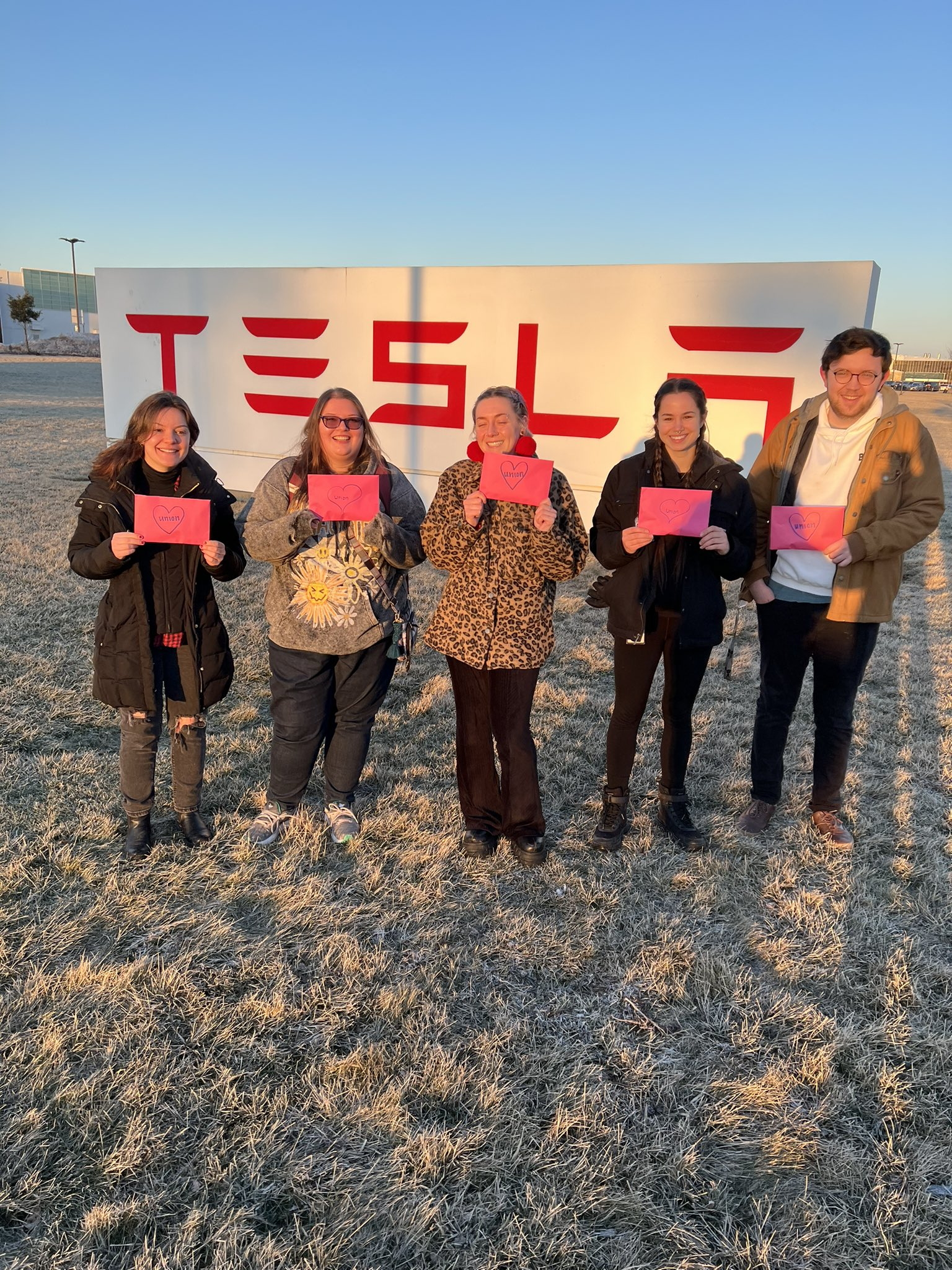
Valentine's Day union drive at Giga New York in 2023

Tesla has had labor disputes in the United States, Germany and Sweden, including an ongoing strike in Sweden. Tesla, Inc., an American electric car and solar panel manufacturer, has more than 140,000 workers employed across its global operations as of January 2024. Tesla CEO Elon Musk has expressed his opposition to unions on Twitter (now called X). The National Labor Relations Board held that one tweet was unlawful, but was overturned by a federal appeals court. All unionization efforts at the Tesla Fremont Factory and Gigafactory New York in the United States have been unsuccessful. In Germany, Gigafactory Berlin-Brandenburg and Tesla Automation have elected works councils, but they have not signed collective bargaining agreements with the German trade union IG Metall. The Gigafactory Berlin-Brandenburg works council is divided into pro-union and anti-union factions. In Sweden, mechanics who are members of the trade union IF Metall have been on strike since October 27, 2023, making it the longest strike in Sweden since 1938. The strike has since spread, with other Swedish, Danish and Norwegian unions calling for solidarity strikes.
