= Tesla and trade unions =

Labor relations of the American car company

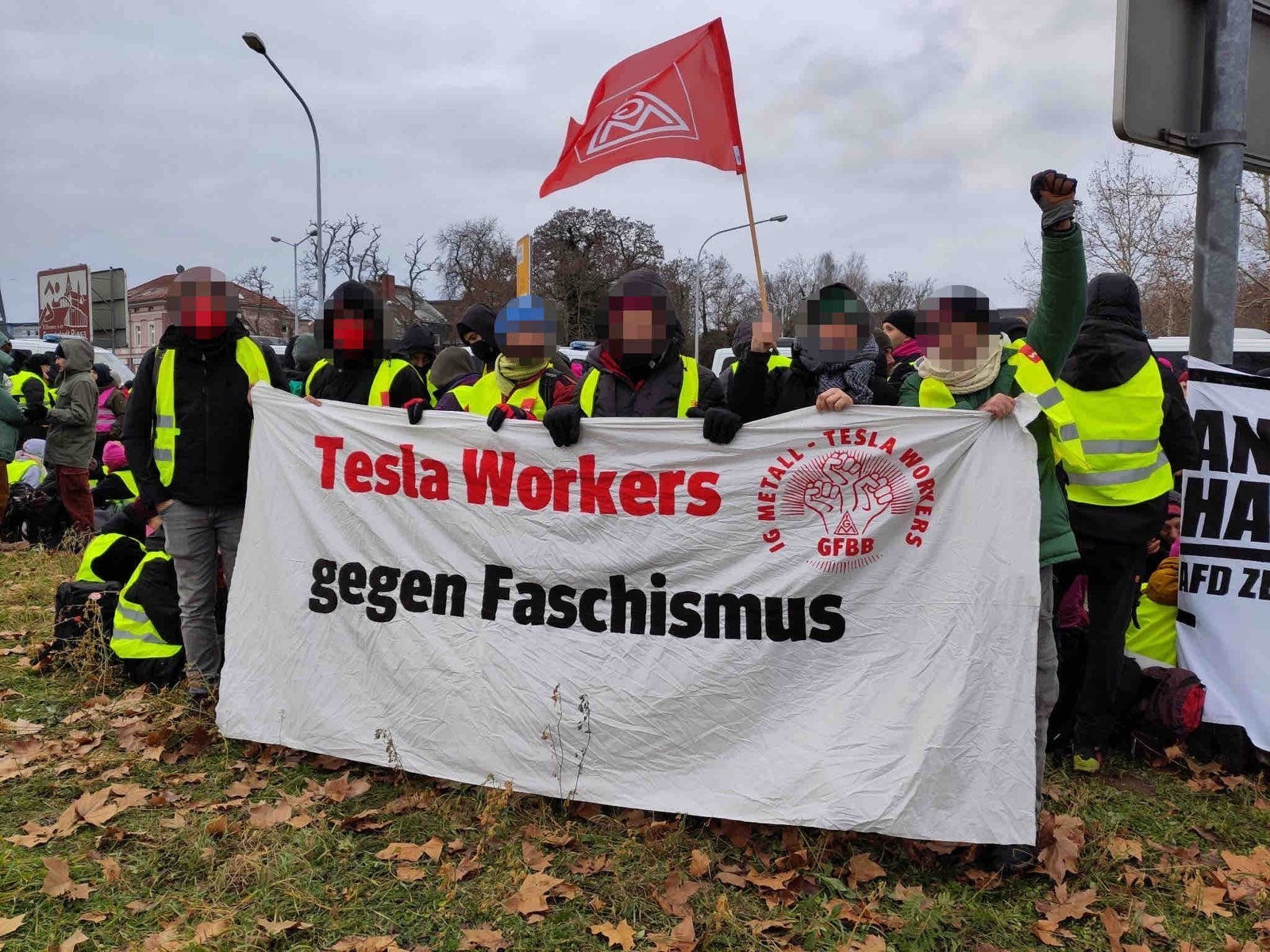
Tesla workers at a 2025 protest in Germany, carrying an IG Metall banner with the slogan "Tesla Workers gegen Faschismus" (transl. Tesla workers against fascism)

Tesla, Inc., an American electric car and solar panel manufacturer, has more than 140,000 workers employed across its global operations as of January 2024, almost none of whom are unionized. Despite allegations of high injury rates, long hours, and below-industry pay, efforts to unionize the workforce have been largely unsuccessful. Elon Musk, Tesla's CEO, has commented negatively on trade unions in relation to the company. Tesla has been involved in labor disputes in the United States, Germany, and Sweden, including an ongoing strike in Sweden.

Tesla is the only major American automaker whose workforce is not represented by a union in the United States. None of the union drives in Tesla Fremont Factory and Gigafactory New York have been successful. In late 2023, United Auto Workers announced renewed unionization efforts.

According to automotive union IG Metall, in Germany, Gigafactory Berlin-Brandenburg's non-union status and lower wages compared to industry standards has weakened the structural power of Metall. Gigafactory Berlin-Brandenburg and Tesla Automation have works councils, without union collective agreement coverage. Tesla Automation signed a remuneration-related works agreement with its works council, while refusing to sign a comparable collective agreement with IG Metall.

In Sweden, mechanics from TM Sweden, a Tesla vehicle service subsidiary, and affiliated with IF Metall went on strike from October 2023–August 2026, which expanded when 14 other trade unions across Sweden, Denmark, Finland and Norway joined by initiating their own solidarity strikes. This was the longest strike in Sweden since the 1938 Saltsjöbaden Agreement. It concluded when IF Metall announced the end of the strike because Tesla had offered severance packages to the remaining 80 striking employees. IF Metall commented that this was unparalleled in Swedish labor history.

== United States ==
Tesla employs 70,000 workers across the United States as of 2024. Tesla is the only American automaker whose workers are not represented by a union in the United States. None of the unionization efforts since 2017 have been successful. These efforts were led by United Auto Workers (UAW) in Fremont Factory in 2017, United Steelworkers and International Brotherhood of Electrical Workers in Gigafactory New York (Giga New York) in 2018, and Workers United in Giga New York in 2023. Several months later, UAW announced renewed nation-wide organizing efforts.

Employer opposition to unions is common in the United States. In cases of illegal interference, such as unfair labor practices, the National Labor Relations Board (NLRB) has limited mechanisms to enforce the law under the National Labor Relations Act – which codifies worker rights. Unlike the Occupational Safety and Health Administration, the NLRB cannot impose fines. Employees in a workplace can form a union if a majority sign union cards or vote in a supervised election. Despite overall low union density (ratio of unionized to non-unionized workers), recent organizing successes have renewed public interest. According to labor sociologist Joshua Mayor, unionization efforts sometimes fail not because workers are against unions, but because workers do not believe they can win. Presidential candidate Donald Trump stated that he supported Musk's policies of union busting during an interview with Musk. The United Auto Workers later filed federal labor charges against Trump and Musk.

=== Fremont Factory ===
Tesla acquired the formerly unionized NUMMI plant in Fremont, California in 2010, which became the Tesla Fremont Factory. Tesla employs 20,000 workers in the Fremont Factory.

United Auto Workers (UAW) president Dennis Williams expressed interest in unionizing the factory in May 2016, shortly after Tesla announced increased local annual production targets of 500,000 vehicles by 2018, which would have placed it in the top ten sellers of new vehicles within the US. In the fall of 2016, Jose Moran, a Fremont Factory employee, contacted UAW, going public with a "Fair Future at Tesla" campaign in February 2017, citing high injury rates, long hours and below industry pay as motivations. In October 2017, Tesla fired Richard Ortiz, who was involved with the organizing campaign, which the NLRB later ruled to be illegal retaliation.

Elon Musk
(@elonmusk)
tweeted:

Replying to @dmatkins137

Nothing stopping Tesla team at our car plant from voting union. Could do so tmrw if they wanted. But why pay union dues & give up stock options for nothing? Our safety record is 2X better than when plant was UAW & everybody already gets healthcare.

May 21, 2018

CEO Elon Musk published a tweet in May 2018, that implied workers would lose stocks if they formed a union. Three years later, the NLRB ordered Musk to delete that tweet, and reinstate former employee Ortiz with full back pay. Additionally, Tesla would have to put up a notice in all of its US factories addressing the unlawful tweet.

Tesla appealed the NLRB rulings to the United States Court of Appeals for the Fifth Circuit, which in 2023 initially upheld the NLRB order. In a published response, Ortiz stated "I look forward to returning to work at Tesla and working with my co-workers to finish the job of forming a union". In a 2024 rehearing, the court reversed its decision, holding Musk's tweets to be constitutionally protected speech and that the NLRB must reconsider its order to reinstate Ortiz.

Four years after the initial tweet, Musk invited UAW, via another tweet, to hold a union election at their convenience without retaliation. UAW president Ray Curry responded that if Tesla was serious about supporting organizing, Tesla would acknowledge they broke the law when they fired Ortiz and Musk published the initial tweet.

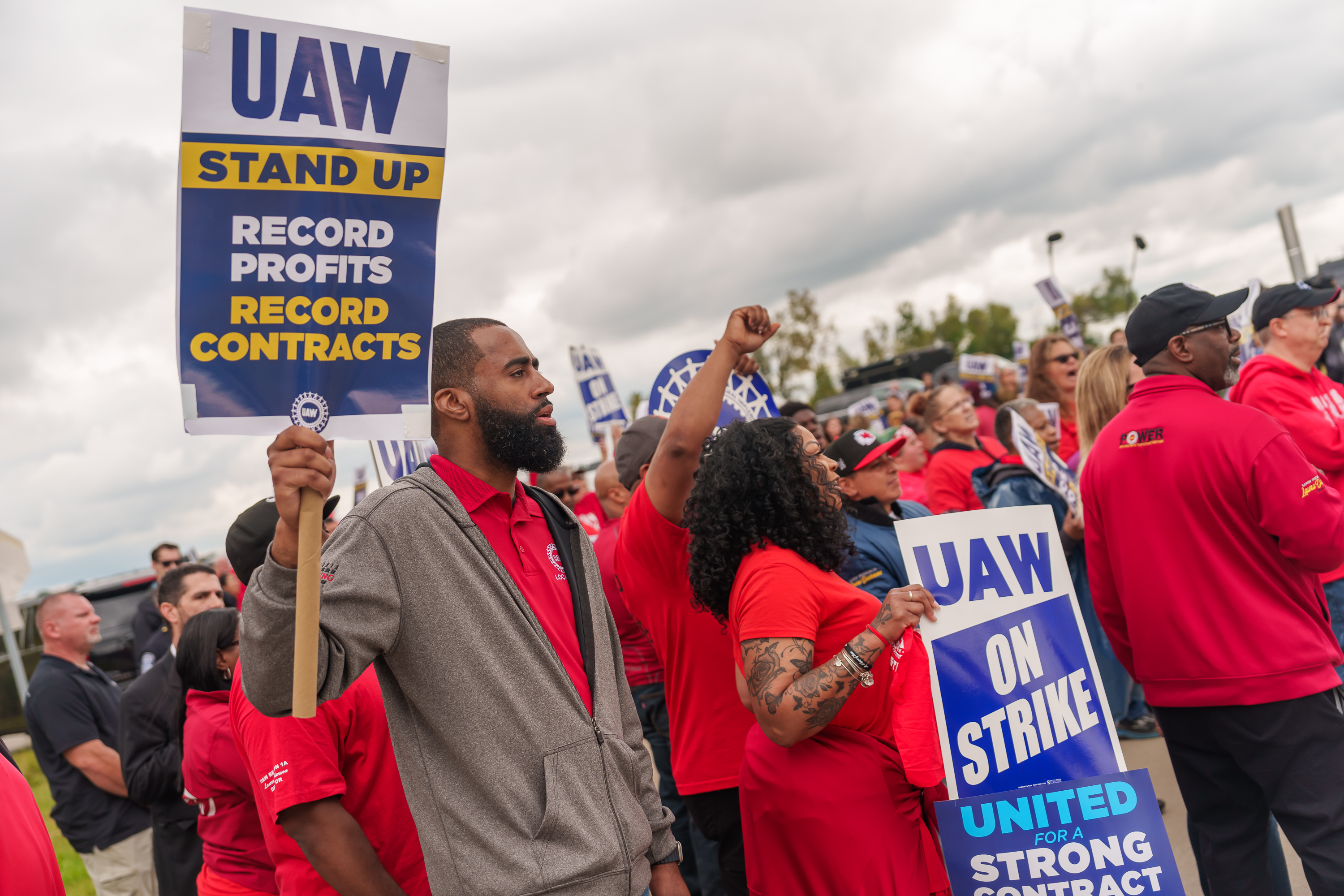
UAW members picketing at General Motors in Michigan during the 2023 strike against the "Big Three"

A CNBC report in 2022 found that Tesla paid public relations firm MikeWorldWide to monitor a Tesla employee Facebook group and union organizers on social media from 2017 to 2018. MikeWorldWide monitored discussions regarding alleged unfair labor practices at Tesla and a sexual harassment lawsuit. Former and current Tesla employees told CNBC that they believed the company continued to monitor its workers on social media as of 2022.

UAW won 30–160 percent salary increases at the "Big Three" in late 2023. The new UAW president Shawn Fain attributed previous unionizing failures to internal corruption, "coziness" with management and bad collective agreements. UAW subsequently launched organizing drives at 13 non-union automakers, including Tesla, with a combined organizing budget of US$40 million through 2026. By contrast, UAW had spent $422,000 on Tesla alone in 2017.

=== Giga New York ===
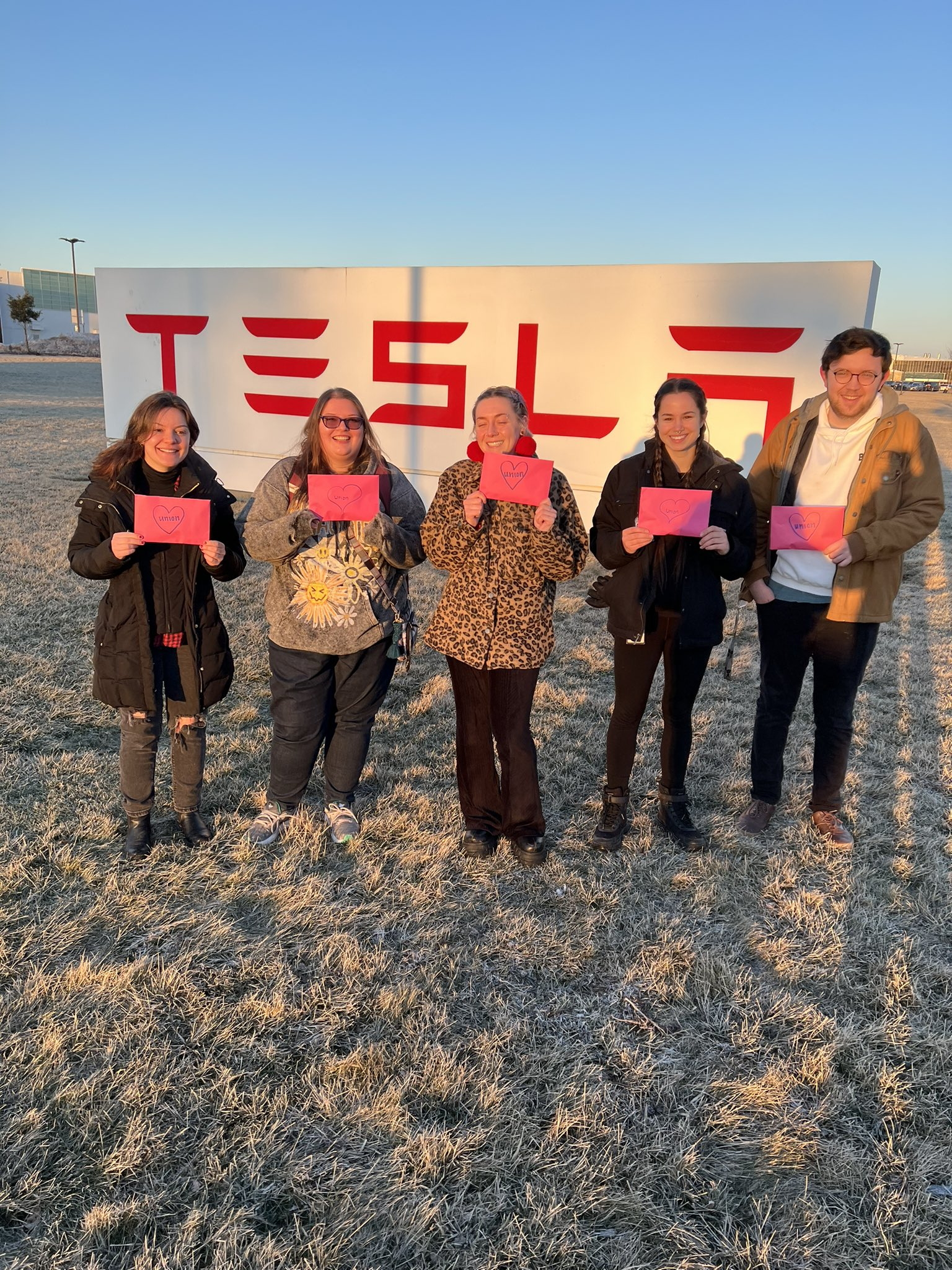
Tesla Workers United going public at Giga New York with Valentine's themed signs

In December 2018, 300 workers at the solar panel factory at Giga New York in Buffalo, New York, announced a union drive with the support of United Steelworkers (USW) and International Brotherhood of Electrical Workers. USW filed a complaint with the NLRB the following June, alleging that Tesla illegally surveilled workers and fired six of them in retaliation, but the case was withdrawn in August.

Workers who label data for Tesla Autopilot at Giga New York in Buffalo announced a union drive with Workers United on February 14, 2023. Workers United previously led the first successful union drive at Starbucks, also in Buffalo, 6 mi (9.7 km) away. A day after the announcement, Workers United filed charges with the NLRB against Tesla for firing 37 workers (including one organizing committee member) in alleged retaliation for union activity and to allegedly discourage union organizing. In November 2023, the NLRB dismissed the retaliatory firing charge, but found merit in the other charges regarding workplace surveillance and captive audience meetings.

Following allegations raised by Workers United, the NLRB regional director in Buffalo, New York filed a complaint with the national board in April 2024 alleging that Tesla had unlawfully implemented company policies to prevent workers at its Buffalo plant from unionizing, including by implementing a corporate IT acceptable use policy that restricted workplace organizing.

== Germany ==
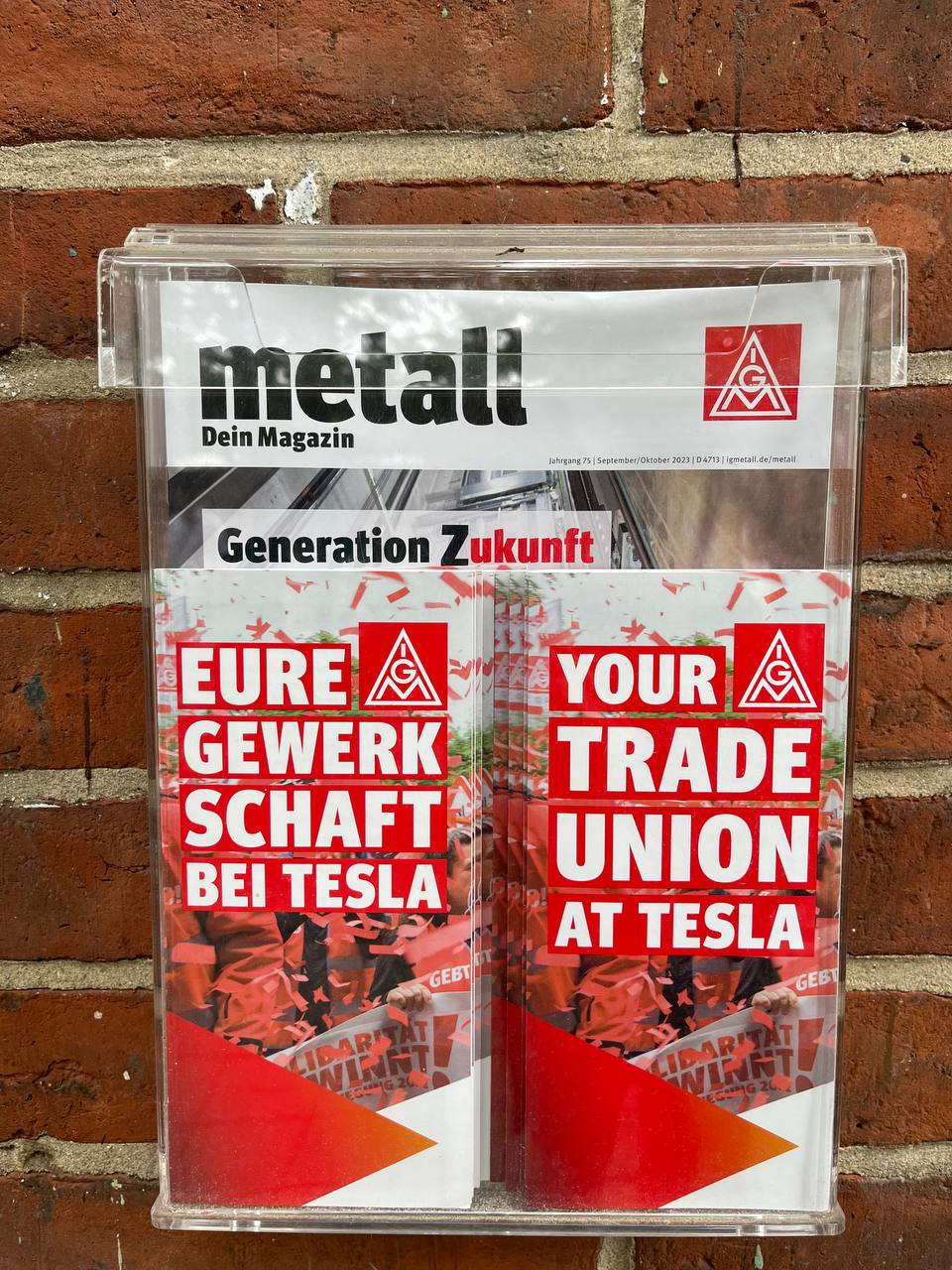
IG Metall brochures in English and German for Tesla employees near Giga Berlin

Tesla is one of the few automakers in Germany that has not signed any individual company collective agreements, nor is a member of the Employer Association in the Metal and Electronics Industry as of 2024. The Metal and Electronics Industry refers to the corresponding network of companies in the sector that negotiates with IG Metall. There are elected works councils at Tesla automation and Gigafactory Berlin-Brandenburg.

German labor representation has a dual structure of trade unions and works councils. Trade unions like IG Metall negotiate collective agreements with individual employers and regional collective agreements with employers associations (e.g. textile or chemical industry). Works councils are made up of elected employees in the workplace. They negotiate works agreements and have various co-determination, participation and information rights. In theory works council co-determination does not overlap with collective bargaining regarding wage adjustments. While formally separate structures, many works council members are de-facto union representatives. Unions are financed by membership dues which are typically 1% of a member's salary. The more union members and the higher their wages (whether or not they are covered by a collective agreement), the more financial resources a union has.

Tesla poses a structural challenge to IG Metall in the automotive sector, because electric vehicle production requires 30 percent fewer workers than traditional internal combustion-engine vehicles. IG Metall membership declined by 9% from 2005 to 2021, while the automotive labor market has grown, especially in companies without regional collective agreements. The overall trend toward vehicle electrification and a non-union Tesla weakens IG Metall's bargaining power in the broader German automotive sector due to lower union density (ratio of unionized to non-unionized workers).

=== Tesla Automation ===
Tesla acquired Grohmann Engineering (now Tesla Automation) in January 2017, inheriting the existing works council. According to IG Metall and the works council chair Uwe Herzig said that wages at Grohmann Engineering in April, after the acquisition, were 25 percent to 30 percent below the equivalent of the regional collective agreements in the Metal and Electronics Industry. In October, management and the works council concluded a works agreement that brought employee wages in line with the regional collective agreement without explicitly signing a union collective agreement. IG Metall pushed for formal ratification, while acknowledging that there had been a "very good negotiation result". It credited the threat of strikes with pressuring Tesla to sign the works agreements.

=== Giga Berlin ===
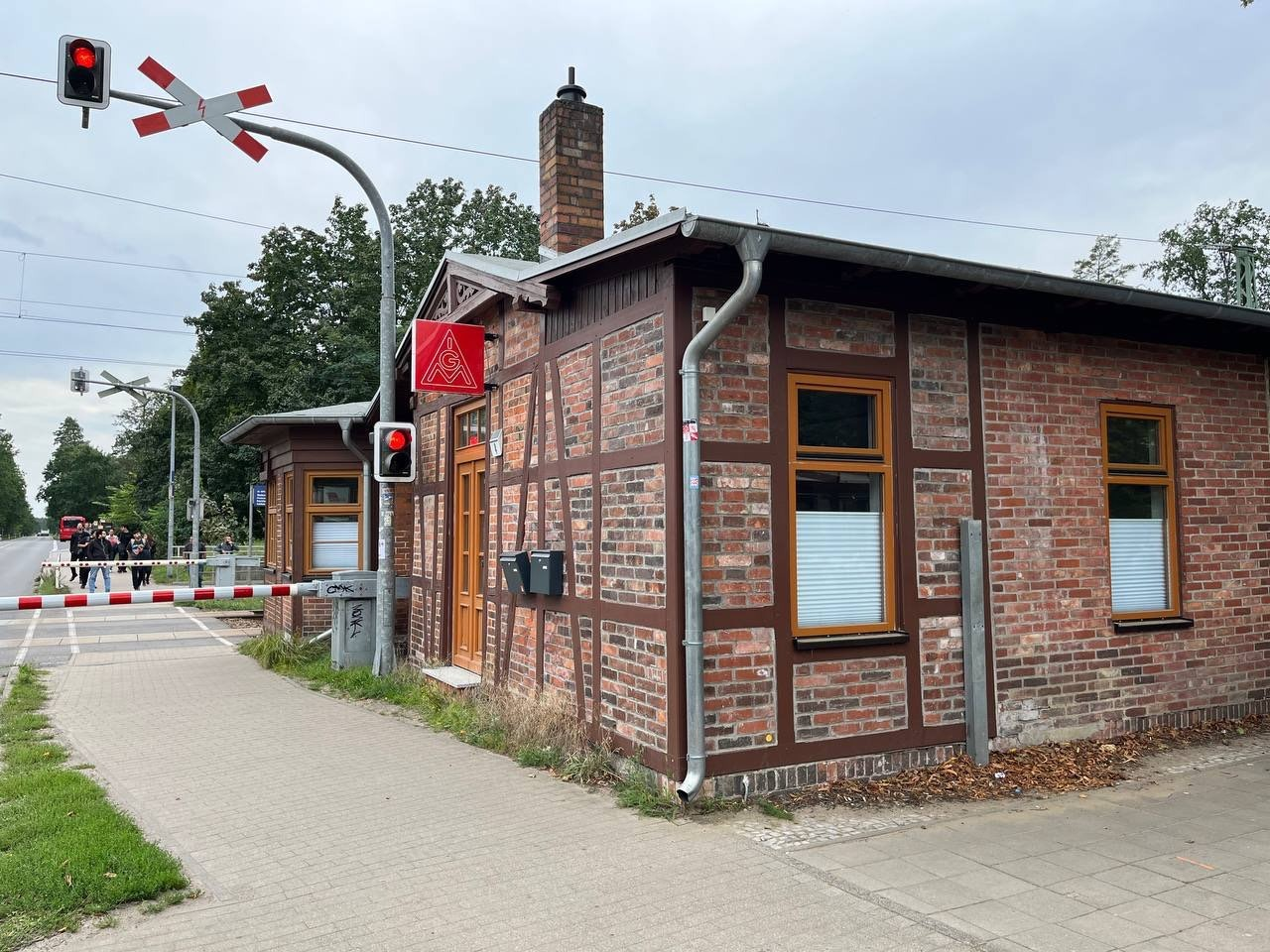
IG Metall office at the train station adjacent to Giga Berlin

According to IG Metall, in October 2021, Tesla offered employees at the new Gigafactory Berlin-Brandenburg (Giga Berlin), wages that were 20 percent below the corresponding collective agreements provided at other automotive plants in Germany.

Seven non-union employees at Giga Berlin initiated the works council election process in November 2021. Any employee with at least six months of tenure is eligible to run as a works council candidate. Tesla ultimately planned to hire a total of 12,000 employees. In the first six months, Tesla hired 1,800 employees, mostly middle-management. IG Metall expressed concern that the future works council would be dominated by management, as only those with 6 months' tenure would be eligible to run. In March 2022, employees elected their first works council. Nearly half voted for the manager-friendly "Gigavoice" list.

IG Metall called for an investigation in January 2023, after workers reported being forced to work longer hours, with less resting time between shifts. IG Metall also stated that workers were being forced to sign non-disclosure agreements and therefore feared retaliation if they openly discussed their working conditions.

Giga Berlin's initial workforce of 1,800 employees doubled quickly enough to trigger a rule requiring another works council election 2 years after the first one, instead of the usual 4 years. The second works council election was scheduled initially for March 18, 2024 to March 20, 2024. IG Metall petitioned the Frankfurt (Oder) Labor Court for a preliminary injunction against the electoral board's proposed timeline. The original timeline set a deadline of February 15 for submitting candidate nominations lists. Given that Tesla factory production was suspended earlier for a month until February 11, due to supply chain disruptions by the Houthi militia in the Red Sea, this would have left each candidate list with only several work days to collect the mandatory 50 signatures from co-workers. The Frankfurt (Oder) Labor Court granted IG Metall's petition, but the electoral board and Tesla appealed to the higher Berlin-Brandenburg State Labor Court, which overturned the lower court and upheld the original election timeline.

The second election concluded on March 20, 2024, with 234 candidates from 9 lists. With 39% of the vote the "IG Metall Tesla Workers GFBB" list won the plurality of seats, with 16 out of 39, making them the largest opposition. The remaining 23 seats were divided among four non-union affiliated lists; 15 seats for "Giga United", 5 seats for "One Team", 2 seats for "Giga Fair" and 1 seat for "Giga für Alle" (transl. Giga for all). Michaela Schmitz, the current works council chair, is vocally anti-union. During the final days of the works council election campaign, Schmitz ended a rally speech with "What we don't need, is a union!" (German: Was wir nicht brauchen, ist eine Gewerkschaft!). On April 4, Schmitz was re-elected by the works council for a second term as chair. Schmitz comes from the "Giga United" list , which is mostly composed of managers. In total, 8,917 Tesla workers voted, out of 12,500 eligible to vote.

An IG Metall member of the works council was fired in October 2024, in what IG Metall described as "aggressive tactics" against workers. IG Metall countered with its own lawsuit in December 2024, to forcibly remove Michaela Schmitz as works council chair; claiming she had obstructed pro-union works council members. In September 2024, in an attempt to crack down on worker absenteeism, Tesla representatives conducted unannounced visits to the homes of employees out on sick leave.

During March 2–4, 2026, Tesla held its third works council election. For the 11,000 workers eligible to vote, 11 competing lists were available to choose who will fill the 37 seats. The "Giga United" list, led by incumbent chair Michaela Schmitz won the most seats, while "IG Metall Tesla Workers GFBB" dropped to second place with 13 seats. In third place was "Polska Inicjatywa GIGA Berlin" (Polish Initiative GIGA Berlin) with 3 seats. The non-union lists cumulatively won 24 seats in total. In the lead-up to the election, IG Metall and Tesla management initiated criminal charges against each other amid a series of escalations. Tesla manager André Thierig called the police on an IG Metall representative for secretly recording an internal works council meeting. In turn, IG Metall filed libel and obstruction of union activity criminal charges.

== Sweden ==
Mechanics affiliated with IF Metall, a Swedish trade union, initiated a strike against TM Sweden, a Tesla vehicle service subsidiary, from October 27, 2023–August 19, 2026, over the company's refusal to sign a collective agreement. It was the longest strike in recent Sweden labor history, and included solidarity strikes by 15 different trade unions across 4 Nordic countries. Strikes are very rare under the "Swedish model" of social partnership, which is codified in the 1938 Saltsjöbaden Agreement, still in force to this day.

Sweden is one of the most unionized countries in the world, with 70% union density, and 90% collective agreement coverage. Most of the coverage is through sectoral collective agreements. Secondary or solidarity strikes are explicitly allowed in Sweden, with few limits. The strong industrial position of workers, means Sweden has one of the lowest strike rates, even within the Nordic regions.

TM Sweden employs 384 employees as of 2024; 250 white collar employees and 130 mechanics or "service technicians". 40 of the white collar employees are members of Unionen, the union for white collar workers. About half of the mechanics are IF Metall members, the union for blue collar workers. Neither union has a collective agreement with Tesla. Unionen did not call for any strike action, except in solidarity with the IF Metall strike.

The IF Metall strike launched on October 27, 2023, initially affecting mechanics at ten workshops servicing Tesla vehicles, later spread to other facilities servicing various car brands. While workers continued with their regular tasks, they refrained from servicing Tesla vehicles during the strike. Strikebreakers arrived at Tesla service centers, prompting concerns among the strikers about their impact on the labor dispute. Strikers were banned from the company premises. According to union leader Gabriel Kuhn, Tesla contacted individual strikers after family members shared news of the strikes on social media, which discouraged non-union participation in the strike. According to statistics from the Swedish National Mediation Office, one-third of the 130 mechanics participated in the original strike. Mainly non-union members, but also some IF Metall union members did not participate in the strikes.

Other Swedish trade unions joined in a month later in November 2023, through sympathy (solidarity) strikes, which are legal in Sweden. The Swedish Transport Workers' Union (Swedish: Svenska Transportarbetareförbundet) blocked the loading and unloading of Tesla cars, while dockworker, electrician and postal unions halted services to Tesla. Elon Musk has reportedly instructed TM Sweden not to sign any collective agreements. The Swedish Union for Service and Communications Employees (Swedish: Service- och Kommunikationsfacket) expanded the strike by halting maintenance and installation of Tesla charging stations. Over the next few months, solidarity strikes for the Swedish campaign spread to other Nordic countries, with port workers from the United Federation of Danish Workers (Danish: Fagligt Fælles Forbund), United Federation of Trade Unions (Norwegian: Fellesforbundet) and Finnish Transport Workers' Union (Finnish: Auto- ja Kuljetusalan Työntekijäliitto) joining the strikes. Tesla maneuvered around the union blockade by moving vehicles by land instead of sea, and sold 1% more cars in 2024 than in 2023.

The strike led to the PensionDanmark, a pension fund, to divest its Tesla shares in protest. In response to the escalations, Tesla posted a job opening for a Swedish government affairs specialist with "significant experience with Nordic legislative and regulatory advocacy", presumably to help with lobbying efforts. In September 2024, a foreign delegation of Ford Germany works council members and IG Metall deputies joined the picket line at Tesla service center in Malmö, Sweden, as the strike continued. In January 2025, Tesla appealed to the Karlstad administrative court to mandate the Swedish Transport Agency provide license plates for newly sold vehicles, which is currently blocked by the postal union's sympathy strike.

After nearly three years, in late May 2026, IF Metall strikes ended in Malmö and Uppsala. According to IF Metall, only a few dozen workers were participating at this point. IF Metall announced that the strike would end on August 19, 2026, because Tesla had offered a severance package to the 80 remaining striking employees.

== See also ==
- Volkswagen and unions
- Criticism of Tesla, Inc. § Working conditions
- Views of Elon Musk
- Elon Musk and trade unions
- Elon Musk salute controversy
