= Vulkangruppe =

German environmental activism group

- Formation: c. 2011
- Location: Germany
- Methods: Direct action, vandalism, sabotage
- Fields: Radical environmentalism Climate movement

The Vulkangruppe, Vulkan Group, or Volcano Group, as it is sometimes rendered in English language sources, is a far-left group based in Germany responsible for sabotage and destruction of energy, railway, and data infrastructure as well as attacks against Tesla, Inc. manufacturing confined to the Berlin region. Vulkangruppe has been associated with far-left, anti-fascist, and anarchist ideology. Those involved with the group occasionally use the names of Icelandic volcanoes as aliases following actions. The group has committed 11 arson attacks since at least 2011.

== Structure and aims ==
Even though the group or groups have been associated with 11 attacks in the Berlin area since 2011, and in spite of a strategy paper from 2015 suggesting a concrete structure, the German police and Bundesverfassungsschutz (the Federal Office for the Protection of the Constitution) officially do not know how the group is organised.

=== Self-declared aims ===
Up until the attack in 2026 the group had published letters explaining their motivation on left extremist media websites; in the latest 2026 attack they sent messages to different media, which did not publish it immediately, to their dismay. In 2021, the group alleged that Tesla, Inc. was "neither ecological nor socially just", and that "our fire stands against the lie of the green automobile" and accused Tesla of being "a corporation that practices overexploitation worldwide, destroys livelihoods, and uses and manufactures colonial relations of exploitation".

In 2024, Vulkangruppe labelled the Tesla CEO Elon Musk as a "techno-fascist". Vulkangruppe associated their attack with "anti-patriarchal motives" and described the arson as a "present for March 8", which is International Women's Day. They stated that the factory "eats up earth, resources, people, labor and spits out 6,000 SUVs, killing machines and monster trucks per week" and suggested that the factory uses up and contaminates local water supplies. After an arson in 2025 in Grunewald Vulkangruppe wrote that it chose the location because of the wealth of its inhabitants, stating "We can no longer afford these rich people," ("Wir können uns diese Reichen nicht mehr leisten") in analogy to Earth Liberation Front actions in Seattle almost 20 years earlier. Nevertheless, police, Bundesnachrichtendienst (the Federal Intelligence Service) and politicians have not used the term ecoterrorism or radical environmentalism, but left-wing terrorism.

== History ==
=== 2010s ===
In October 2011, a series of arson and attempted arson attacks on railway infrastructure in the Berlin area caused major disruptions to rail services. A group calling itself "Hekla-Empfangskomitee" claimed responsibility, prompting federal prosecutors to take over the investigation on suspicion of politically motivated sabotage. Due to similarities in language, content, and recurring volcanic symbolism, security authorities believe these groups were connected to Vulkangruppe and to later arson attacks. Three actions against infrastructure in Berlin between 2011 and 2013 were claimed by groups associating themselves with the Icelandic volcanoes Eyjafjallajökull, Hekla and Grímsvötn. In 2018, after a hiatus of seven years, Vulkangruppe claimed responsibility for the destruction of power lines in the Charlottenburg district of Berlin, which caused a power outage affecting approximately 6,500 homes and 400 businesses. Damages related to this event were estimated at several thousand euros.

=== 2020s ===
In 2020, Vulkangruppe claimed responsibility for an arson attack at the Heinrich Hertz Institute in Berlin, a research institute for digital infrastructure. In 2021, Vulkangruppe damaged power cables with fire at a transmitter tower in Grünheide, the construction site of Tesla's first European Gigafactory Berlin-Brandenburg.

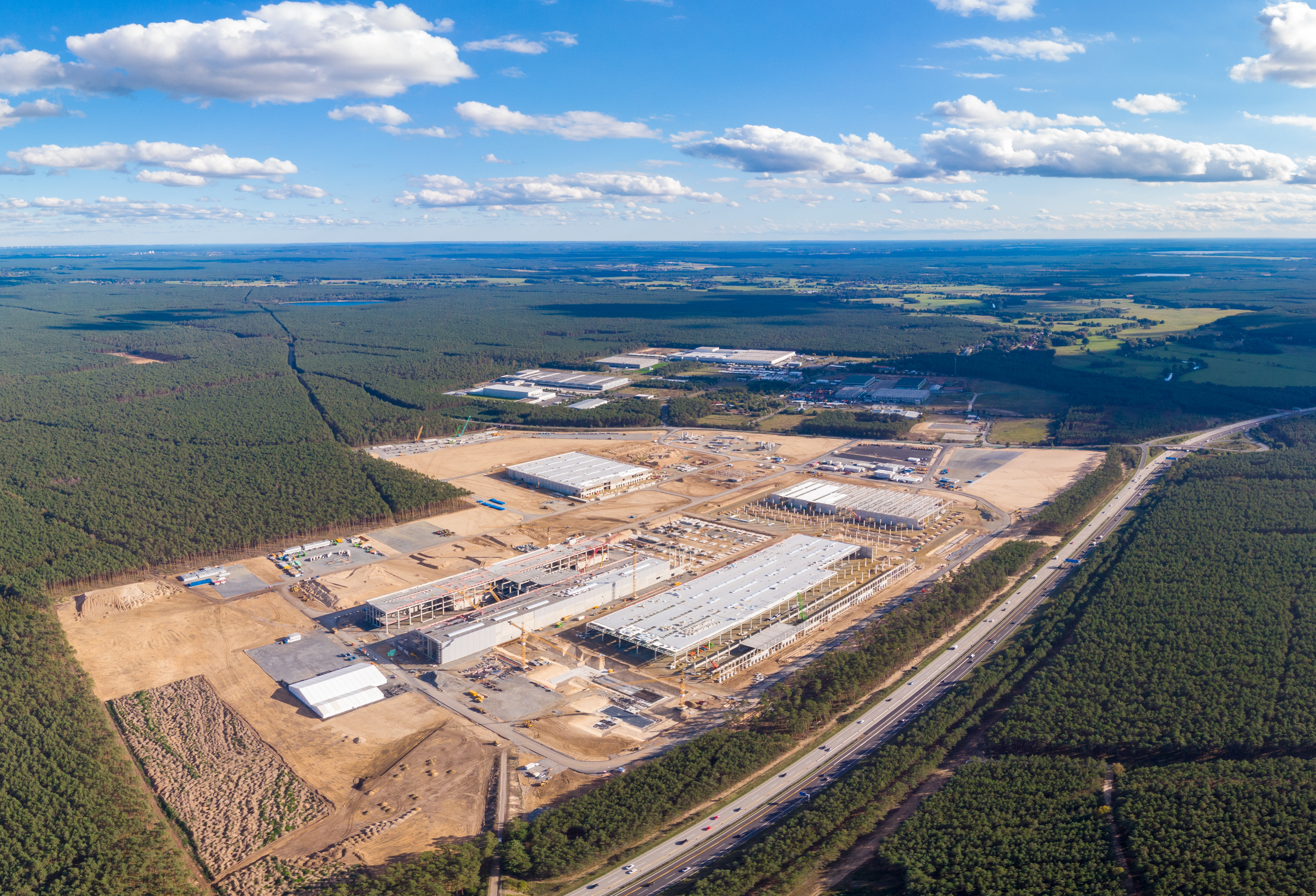
The Tesla site targeted by Vulkangruppe

In March 2024, Vulkangruppe claimed responsibility for burning an electricity pylon at the same Tesla car manufacturing site in Berlin as their 2021 action. It occurred within the wider context of environmental activism targeted at electric car production sites. In the local context, there had been "much debate about the high usage of groundwater" by Tesla in an area which had been "suffering from drought for several years", in combination with "dismay" concerning the "amount of forest that had been felled" to construct the factory. The Tesla factory construction has been controversial because of its location in a water protection zone, and had met protest and criticism from local residents and environmental activist groups. After the event, German interior minister Nancy Faeser suggested that "it was further proof that the left-wing extremist scene does not shy away from attacks on critical energy infrastructures".

In 2025, Vulkangruppe claimed responsibility for arson of a radio mast and a transformer station in Grunewald in May. In August 2025, a five-page pamphlet circulated and was attributed to Vulkangruppe. The authors of the pamphlet articulated their aim to target Russian and Ukrainian oligarchs and to disrupt the Israeli embassy through attacks on energy infrastructure. The pamphlet also articulated an opposition to people inciting hatred against migrants. In September 2025, a suspected arson attack on power cables in Johannisthal, Berlin caused a major blackout, leaving around 50,000 households without electricity for several days. While no immediate claim of responsibility was made, the incident resembled infrastructure attacks by Vulkangruppe.

==== 2026 attack ====
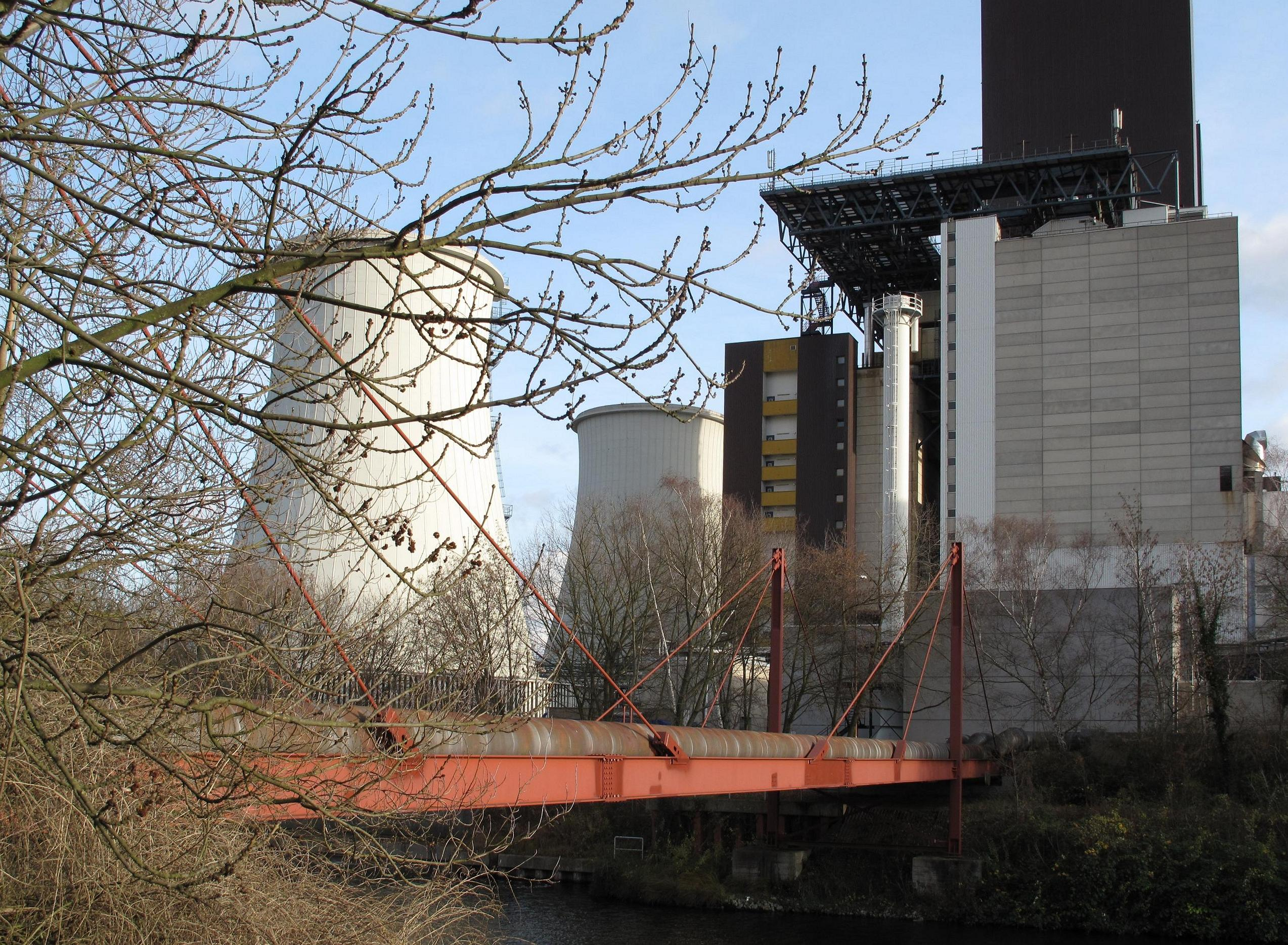
The cable bridge affected by the 2026 arson attack, with the Lichterfelde power plant behind it (2009)

In January 2026, Vulkangruppe claimed responsibility for an action involving an attack on power cables in Berlin which resulted in power outage for 45,000 households and 2,000 firms. The action targeted a gas-fired Lichterfelde power plant. In a statement following the event, Vulkangruppe framed their action as an "act of resistance" concerning "greed for energy ... that is sucking dry, burning, maltreating, raping" the Earth.

Vulkangruppe claimed that their action was "aimed at the common good" and was an "act of self-defense and international solidarity with all those who are defending the Earth and life". Reporting in Der Tagesspiegel also associated the group's actions with an opposition to artificial intelligence. An 83-year-old woman was reported dead, potentially as a result of the outage. Burglaries were also reported in the area, and train and phone services were disrupted. In addition, five local hospitals were forced to switch to emergency power.

== Political analysis and commentary ==
In May 2025 Mauro Lubrano, a researcher at the University of Bath, described the group's actions within the wider context of an "anti-technology campaign rooted in insurrectionary anarchism". Thomas Turnbull characterised the group as a part of "a newer generation" that "are refusing to accept the bromides of green capitalism". Writing in Journal of Environmental Psychology, Amarins Jansma et al. framed Vulkangruppe's actions within the context that "some groups are turning to extreme measures in their search for significance" within broader "efforts to combat climate change and environmental harm", referring to the broader psychological framework of 'significance quest theory'. Jansma et al. suggest that the activities undertaken by Vulkangruppe, and similar groups, are an indication "that the nonviolent discourse within the climate movement is changing and highlights the need to comprehend the violent motivations of protesters". Writing in Die Stimme Berlins, Axel Lier has suggested that the "central justification of the group" is that "if a system is deadly, it can and must be blocked. Doing nothing means complicity, action – even radical action – is a moral duty".

== Works ==
- Manifesto following the January 2026 actions on The Anarchist Library
