= Baberowsee =

Lake in Brandenburg, Germany

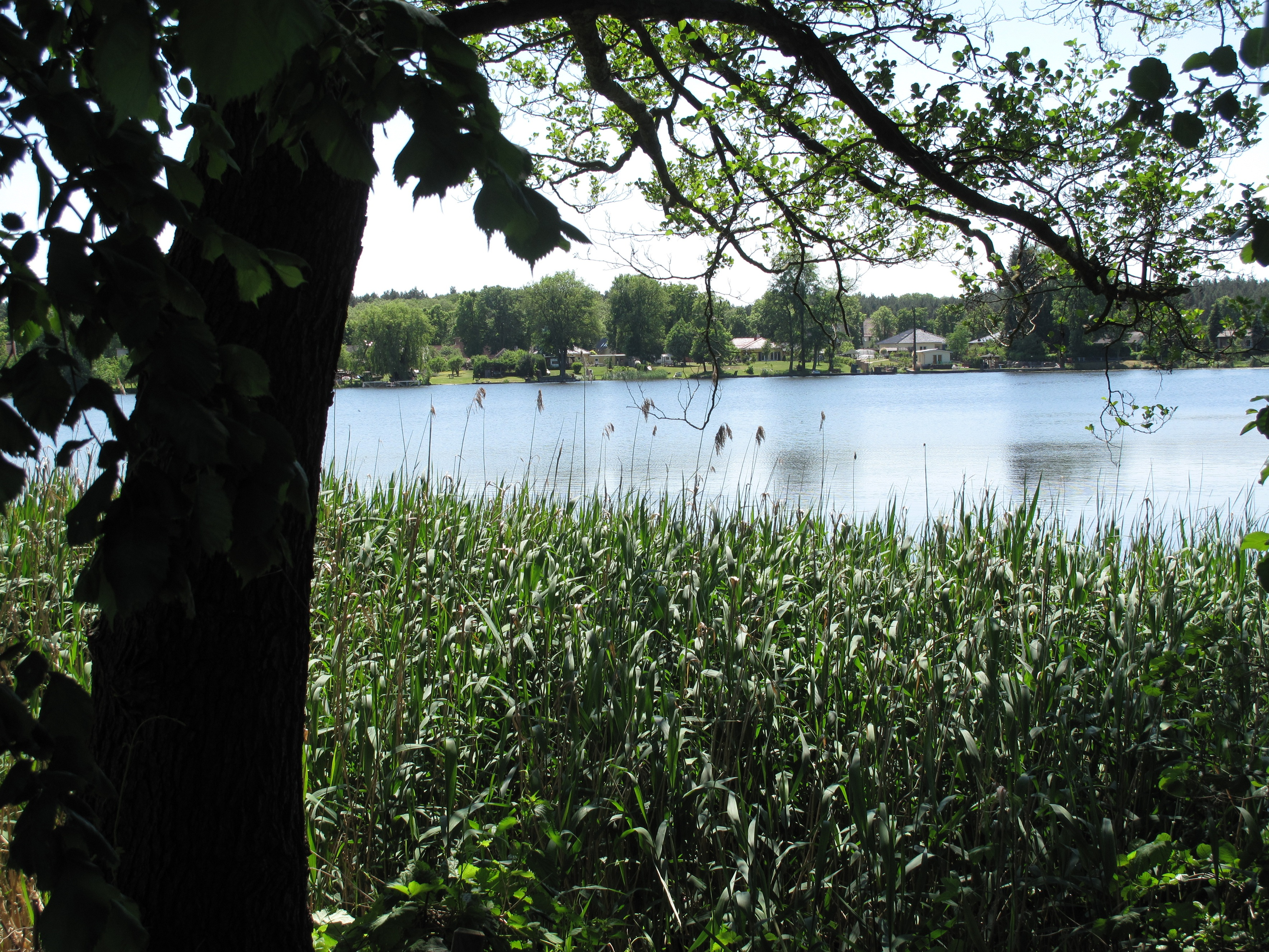
- Baberowsee 01

- Location within Brandenburg
- Location: Brandenburg
- Coordinates: 52°27′32.4″N 13°54′18″E
- Primary inflows: Channel from Elsensee
- Primary outflows: Channel to Bauernsee
- Basin countries: Germany
- Max. depth: 5.5 m (18 ft)

Baberowsee is a lake in Brandenburg, Germany. It is located in Kagel (Grünheide), an Ortsteil of the municipality of Grünheide, Oder-Spree district.
