= Lichterfelde Heat and Power Station =

Cogeneration power station in Berlin, Germany

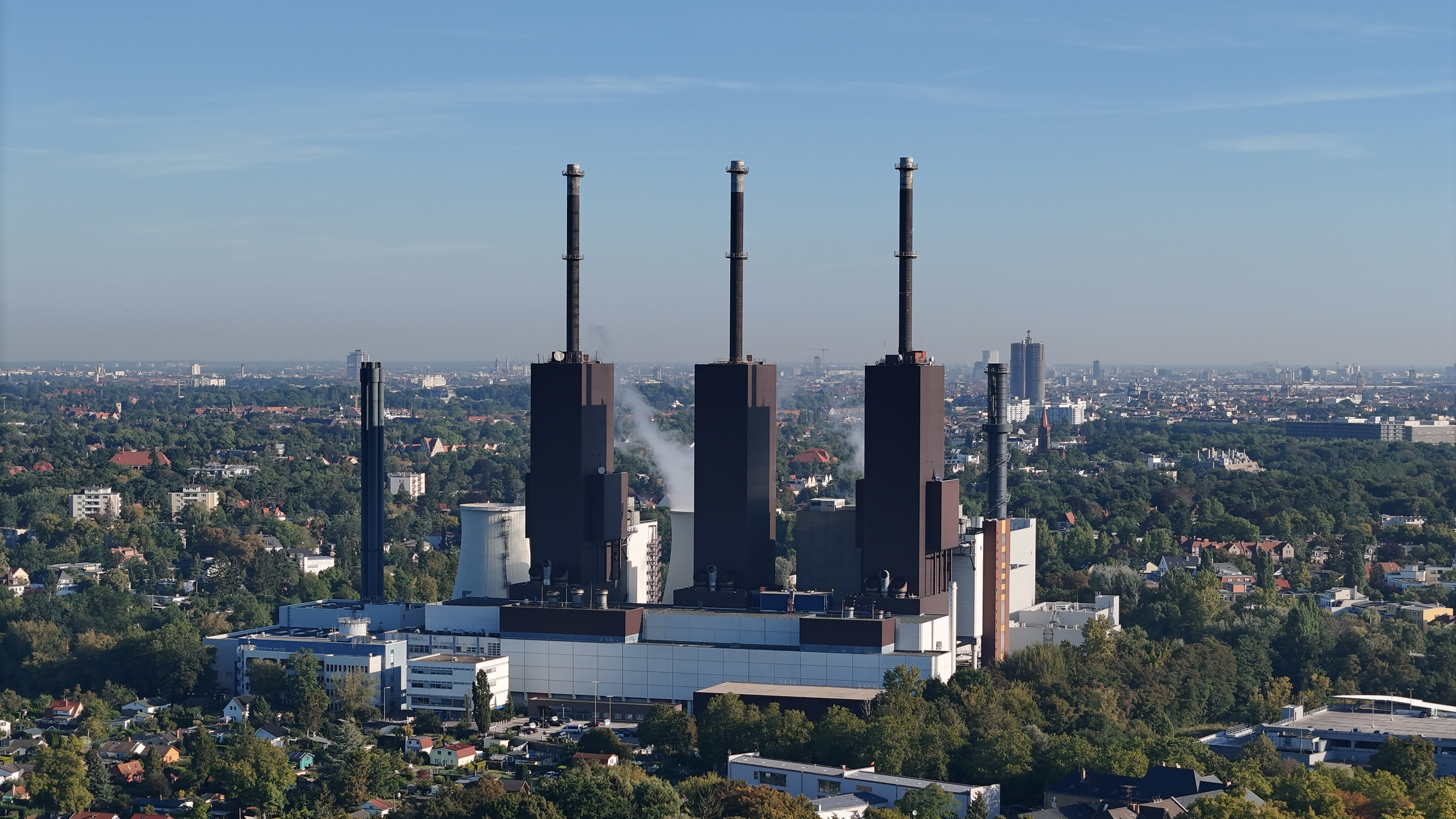
- September 2023
- Country: Germany
- Location: Lichterfelde, Berlin
- Coordinates: 52°25′32.16″N 13°18′36″E
- Status: Commissioned
- Operator: BEW Berliner Energie und Wärme
- Cogeneration?: Yes

Power generation
- Nameplate capacity: 300 MW

External links
- Website: powerplants.vattenfall.com/de/lichterfelde
- Commons: Related media on Commons

Lichterfelde Heat and Power Station (German: Heizkraftwerk Lichterfelde) is a combined heat and power station in the Lichterfelde quarter of Berlin, Germany.

== See also ==
- 2026 arson attack on the Berlin power grid
- List of power stations in Germany
