= Peetzsee =

Lake in Oder-Spree District, Brandenburg, Germany

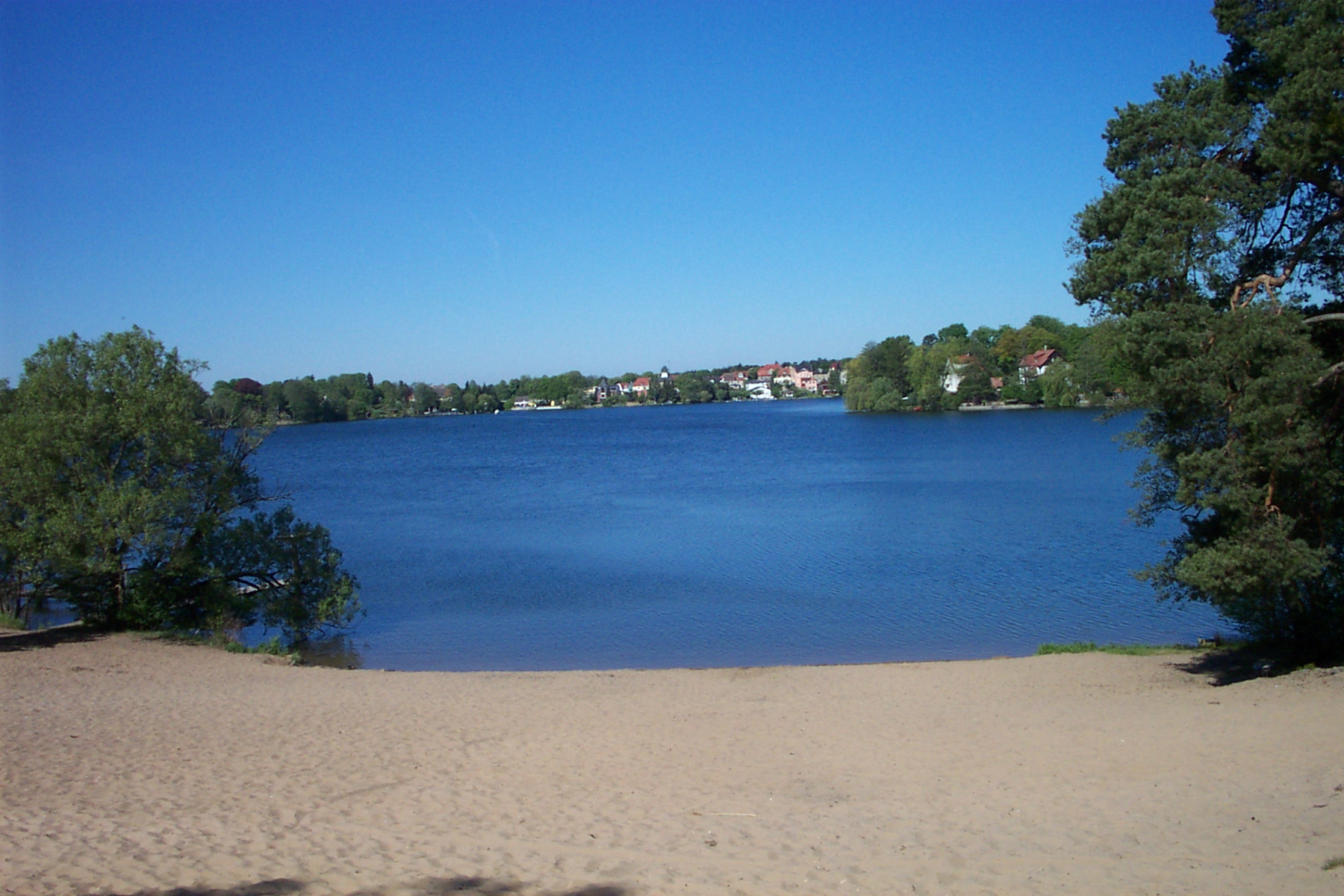

- Location within Brandenburg
- Location: Landkreis Oder-Spree, Brandenburg
- Coordinates: 52°25′25.9″N 13°50′1.2″E
- Basin countries: Germany
- Average depth: 4 to 5 m (13 to 16 ft)
- Max. depth: 19 m (62 ft)

Peetzsee is a lake in Landkreis Oder-Spree, Brandenburg, Germany. It is in the municipality of Grünheide, not far from Berlin.
