= Project Crystal Sun =

Planned solar array fabrication plant

- Built: November 2026- present
- Location: Fort Bend County, Texas, United States
- Coordinates: 29°26′13″N 95°42′31″W
- Industry: Photovoltaics
- Products: Solar cells, Solar panels
- Owner: Tesla, Inc.

Project Crystal Sun is a planned vertically integrated manufacturing complex for solar modules being developed by Tesla in Fort Bend County, Texas. The plant is to output solar modules, producing components from silicon ingots and solar wafers to finished cells and panels. It was announced in August 2026, with operations targeted for Q1 2029. Tesla projects 9,712 permanent jobs by 2033.

== Development ==
In August 2026, Tesla filed for a $10.1 billion solar cell factory in Fort Bend County in the Greater Houston metropolitan area, under the codename "Project Crystal Sun", according to a tax-incentive application posted by the Texas Comptroller.

Tesla has not provided information about the factory's production capacity or the intended applications of its products. According to Heise, applications on Earth are plausible, while "it is also possible that they are intended for use in space", for example for SpaceX's Starlink or Starmind satellites. The article references the Terafab project under joint development by Tesla and SpaceX since March 2026.

In November 2026, it was announced Tesla had begun earthworks on the roughly 3,000-acre site in Fort Bend County.

Electrek commented the planned fully vertically integrated "ingot-to-module" production process as "rare in the US. Most domestic 'solar manufacturing' is module assembly using cells imported from Asia" and described it as "raw polysilicon in one end and finished cells and modules out the other".

== Nueces County facility ==
On 20 November 20206, it was reported that Tesla had applied for tax incentives on a planned $3.1 billion investment in a new polysilicon plant in Nueces County, Texas. The plant would produce solar grade silicon, with a begin of operations in 2030 and an employee count of 515 by 2032. According to Reuters noted the facility would "create a new domestic source of polysilicon, a material primarly produced in China."
