= 2026 arson attack on the Berlin power grid =

Infrastructure-devastating arson attack

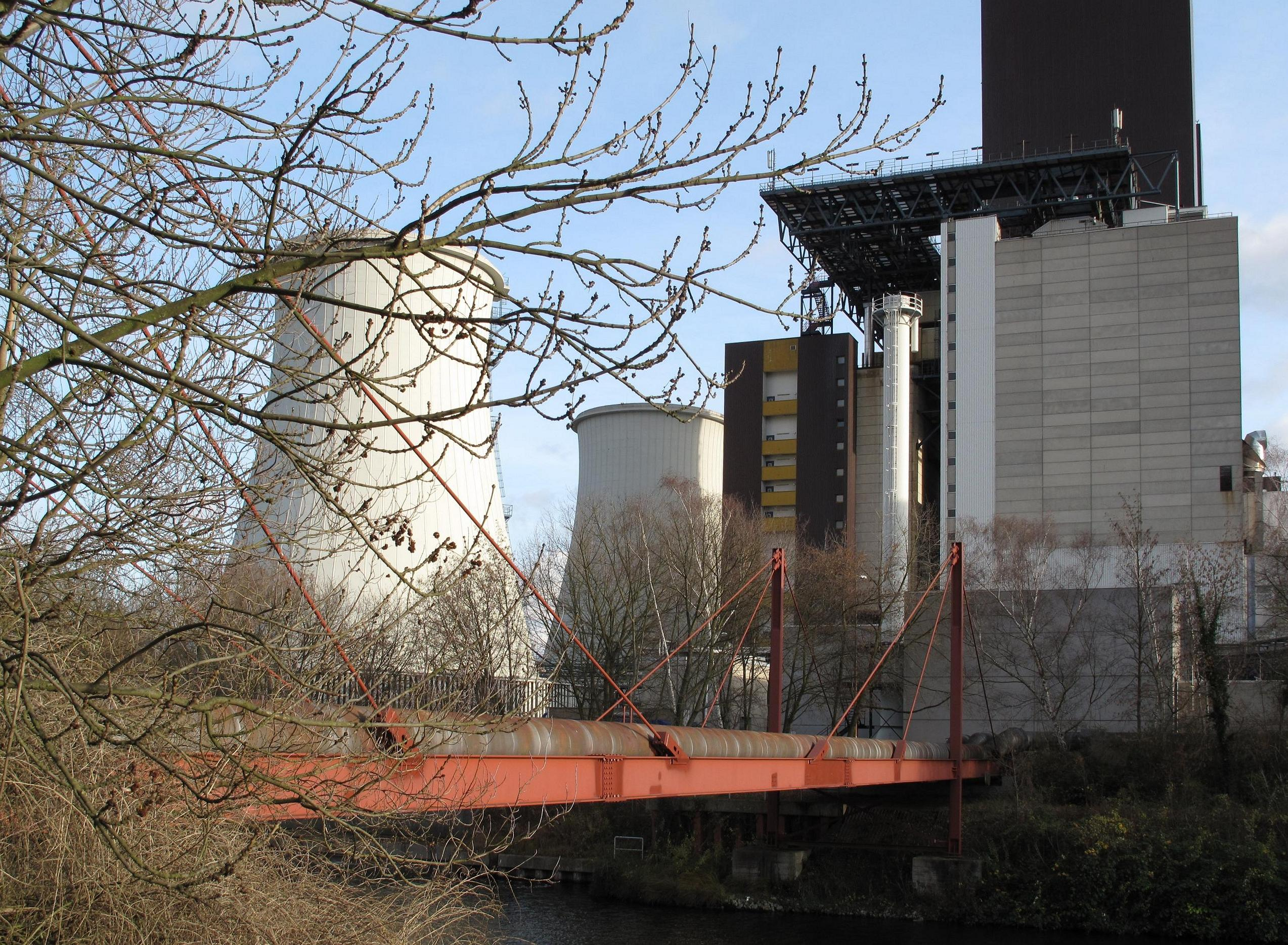
- The cable bridge that was set on fire at Lichterfelde Heating and Power Station (November 2009)
- Date: January 3–7, 2026
- Location: Lichterfelde, Berlin, Germany
- Type: Arson
- Suspects: Vulkangruppe (alleged)

An arson attack on the Berlin power grid was carried out on January 3, 2026, resulting in power outages for more than 40,000 households and 2,000 businesses across southwest Berlin. The attack consisted of a cable bridge in Lichterfelde being set on fire, leading to the longest lasting power outage in the city since 1945. The power outage was not fully resolved for four days.

A letter claiming responsibility was published on the Internet by the left-wing extremist Vulkangruppe. However, a few days later, Vulkangruppe distanced itself from the actions carried out in its name. On January 6, 2026, investigations were transferred from the Berlin police to the Public Prosecutor General due to accused membership of the perpetrators in a terrorist organization.

== Incident ==
=== Initial attack and aid effort ===
In Lichterfelde, unknown perpetrators set fire to several power lines on a cable bridge over the Teltow Canal at the combined heat and power plant at around 6:00 AM CET on January 3, 2026. Five 110 kV high-voltage cables and ten 10 kV medium-voltage cables were destroyed and had to forcibly be switched off. The high-voltage cables belonged to three feeder lines of a ring line leading from a substation on the site of the plant via the affected cable bridge, crossing to the other side of the canal. This connects Dahlem, Schlachtensee, Claszeile, and Kopernikus substations. Said stations supply parts of the districts of Dahlem, Schlachtensee, Lichterfelde, Nikolassee, Wannsee, and Zehlendorf.

Since the pipeline's online independent feed-in point was destroyed, the government was unable to quickly restore power to the afflicted areas. The electricity (and therefore heating) supply of around 100,000 people and more than 2,200 companies in the southwestern part of Berlin failed in cold winter weather. Nursing homes and hospitals were also affected. Fifteen schools and many daycare centres were closed until January 7.

Overnight from January 4 to 5, the Senate Department of Interior and Sport declared a major damage situation in accordance with the Act on Disaster Control in the State of Berlin due to the attack, and the state government applied for administrative assistance from the Bundeswehr on January 5. This was for the purpose to transport fuel for the operation of emergency generators. On January 6, accommodations were made available for external civilian volunteers in the Steinhoff Kaserne. Truppenküche helped prepare meals for affected persons.

=== Restoration of power ===
In the night from January 3 to 4, 7,000 households and 150 businesses were reconnected to the power grid according to Stromnetz Berlin. On January 4, around noon, five hospitals, 10,000 households, and 300 more businesses in Lichterfelde were resupplied with power.

In addition to the existing network (mostly due to failed DSLAMs and powerless users), mobile communications were also affected by the outage. O2 announced that 18 of its transmitters in the area were affected. Vodafone Germany had 38 locations affected by the outage, 29 of which came back online by January 5, as were 19 of 29 affected stations by Deutsche Telekom.

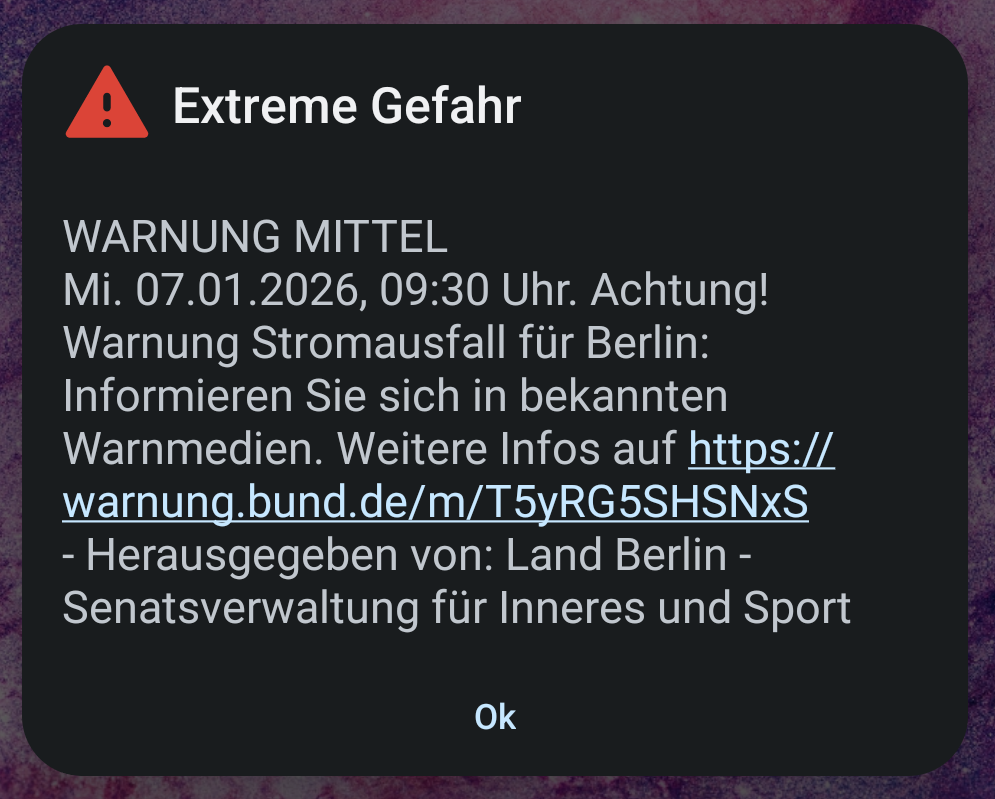
Emergency alert notification sent to Berlin households

On January 5, Mayor Kai Wegner, Iris Spranger, and Franziska Giffey held a joint press conference stating that the medium-voltage cables had been damaged, but repaired quickly. They stated that since the high-voltage cables had also been destroyed, tens of thousands of households would not have electricity restored quickly. That day, further connections were successful. At 7:30 PM, around 27,200 households and 1,425 businesses still lacked power. The next day, the power supply for all three affected S-Bahn systems (Mexikoplatz, Nikolassee, and Wannsee) was restored. Total restoration of power was initially expected by January 8.

Early on January 7, power supply was expected to be fully restored by 11:00 AM. Previously, an emergency alert to all Berlin households urged to disconnect all private emergency generators and avoid heavy electricity consumption. At 2:10 PM, according to Giffey, fully resupply of power was achieved in Berlin. Despite power being restored, affected Berlin schools continued the outstanding closure, with planned reopenings for January 9.

== Investigation ==
Responsibility for the attack was claimed by the Vulkangruppes, with a letter of acknowledgement being published on Indymedia, a left-wing Internet forum. The attack there was described as "action oriented towards the common good", and was in protest against the use of fossil fuels for electricity. Investigations conducted by the Berlin State Criminal Police Office considered the letter to be authentic. Despite this, the Federal Ministry of the Interior stated that investigation of the motive was still pending and that investigations were ongoing.

Following publication of the letter of responsibility, Bundestag member Roderich Kiesewetter expressed suspicion on Welt on January 5, alleging that the letter was translated from Russian into German due to grammatical issues in the letter. He demanded that Germany become more resilient against Russian acts of sabotage. However, Marco Langner, VP of the Berlin Police, described the report and similar ones as "fake news" the following day. A follow-up was published on the leftist portal knack.news rejecting allegations of foreign interference. Another letter was published on January 7 by a group claiming responsibility for the 2011 arson attacks in Berlin, who distanced themselves from the act.

On January 6, the investigation was taken over by the Public Prosecutor General because the alleged perpetrators are accused of being involved with terrorist organizations. On the basis of a now-deleted fourth letter, the Berlin police checked electrical infrastructure in the Marzahn-Hellersdorf district on January 8, an examination of which led to no new findings.

The Bundeskriminalamt (Federal Police) on January 26, 2026 offered a reward of €1,000,000 until February 24 for information resulting in identification of suspects. Additional personnel targeting left-wing extremism was to be allocated to the Verfassungsschutz (Domestic Intelligence Agency).

On March 24 2026, search warrants were executed in several boroughs of Berlin as well as other German cities, targeting locations associated with four suspected perpetrators and aiming primarily to get hold of electronics / communication devices. A total of 17 locations were searched, 14 in Berlin, during a large-scale operation involving 500 police personnel. The two men and two women aged 28-35 were not arrested.

== Response and reactions ==
Mayor Wegner came under criticism for "lack of presence" on site and "insufficient crisis communication". Spranger was also criticized. Both visited an emergency shelter during the crisis. On January 4, Wegner held a press conference stating that he had spent the entire previous day on the phone coordinating efforts and to obtain information. It was later revealed that Wegner had been playing tennis with his partner, Katharina Günther-Wünsch, that day. This led to criticism and accusations of lies by his party's coalition partner, SPD. The Greens and Die Linke also criticized his behavior, although the CDU chairman stated it was due to a delayed insight into the scope of the outage. Politicians of the FDP and AfD, as well as the BSW demanded his resignation. Wegner contradicted the demands for resignation the following day and justified them with a successful crisis management. The one-hour absence had served to "grasp and organize thoughts", he said.

In January 2026 the ruling coalition parties made the protection of critical infrastructure against domestic and foreign threats one of the important tasks for the coming year. This included a planned curtailment of publicly available information about infrastructure; a reduction in the transparency of the state.

On 7 July, Der Tagesspiegel reported, citing the Senate Chancellery, that Wegner had not made any official phone calls related to the blackout until 12:45 p.m., nearly seven hours after the initial attack. This contradicted Wegner's previous statement that he had begun coordinating a response to the crisis around 8 a.m. This led to Wegner stepping down as the CDU's lead candidate in the 2026 state election, though he remains in office.
