= Gigafactory Berlin-Brandenburg =

Tesla, Inc. factory

Gigafactory Berlin
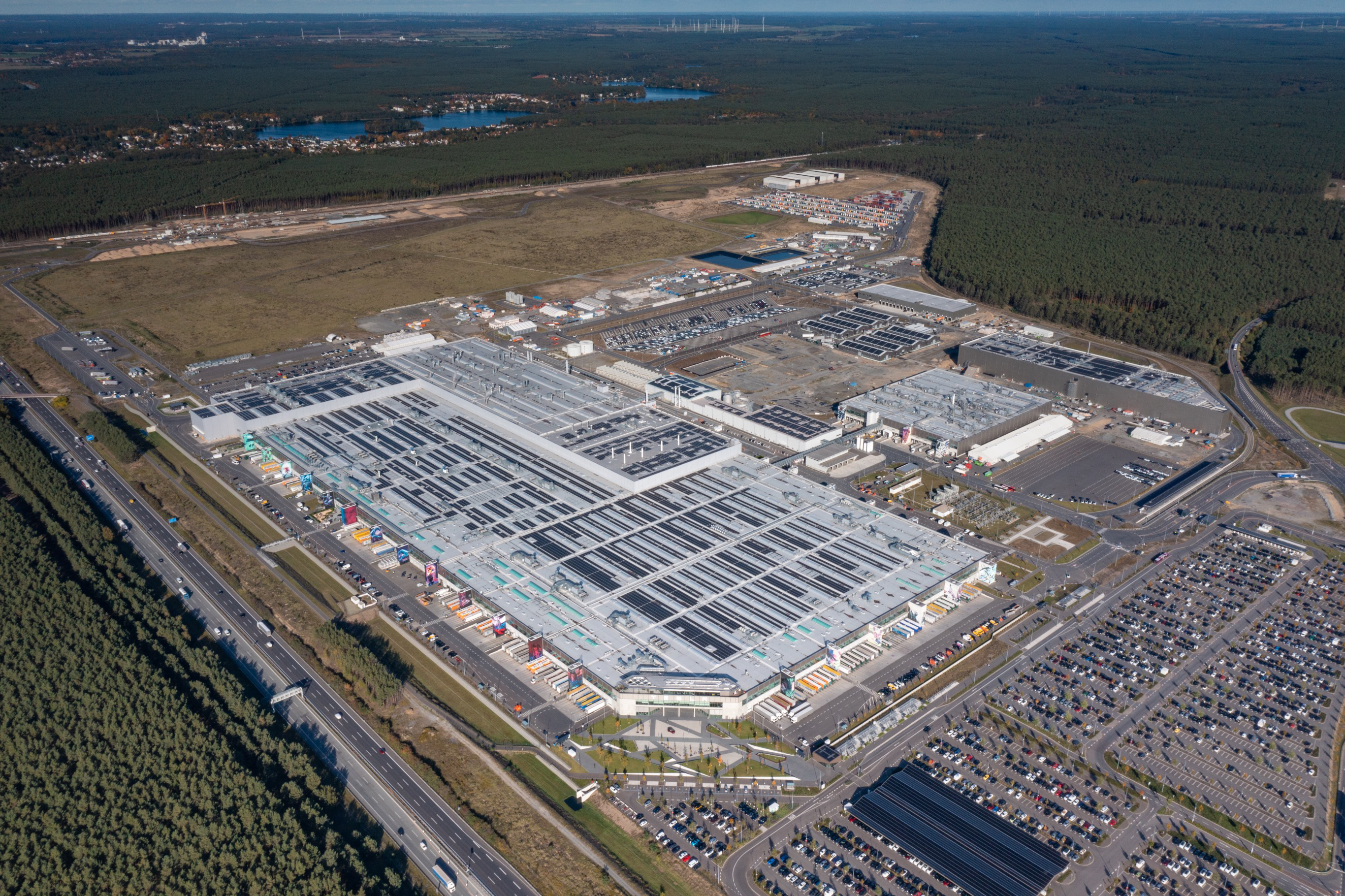
- Gigafactory Berlin-Brandenburg in October 2025
- Built: 2019–2021
- Operated: March 2022
- Location: Tesla Straße 1; Grünheide (Mark), Germany
- Coordinates: 52°23′42″N 13°47′24″E
- Industry: Automotive
- Products: Model Y
- Employees: 11,500
- Area: 3 km^{2} (1.2 sq mi; 740 acres)
- Owner: Tesla, Inc.
- Website: tesla.com/giga-berlin

Gigafactory Berlin-Brandenburg (also known as Giga Berlin or Gigafactory 4) is a manufacturing plant for Tesla, Inc. in the municipality of Grünheide (Mark) in Brandenburg, Germany. The campus is located 35 kilometres (20 mi) southeast of central Berlin and some 8 kilometres (5 mi) southeast of the Berlin state boundary at Erkner and Rahnsdorf. Proximity to Berlin Brandenburg Airport (about 20 km or 12 mi west) was explicitly cited as a factor in choosing the site. It is Tesla's first manufacturing location in Europe.

The facility and its Brandenburg location were announced by Tesla CEO Elon Musk on 12 November 2019, at the Das Goldene Lenkrad award show. The factory was planned to produce batteries, battery packs and powertrains for use in Tesla vehicles, and also assemble the Tesla Model Y, with a proposed start of production in 2021. Construction work began in early 2020 with site preparation and foundation work underway. The factory was expected to begin operations in July 2021, but that was delayed due to administrative troubles. The "Giga Fest" celebration of completion was held in October 2021, and on 22 March 2022, the factory officially opened.

== History ==
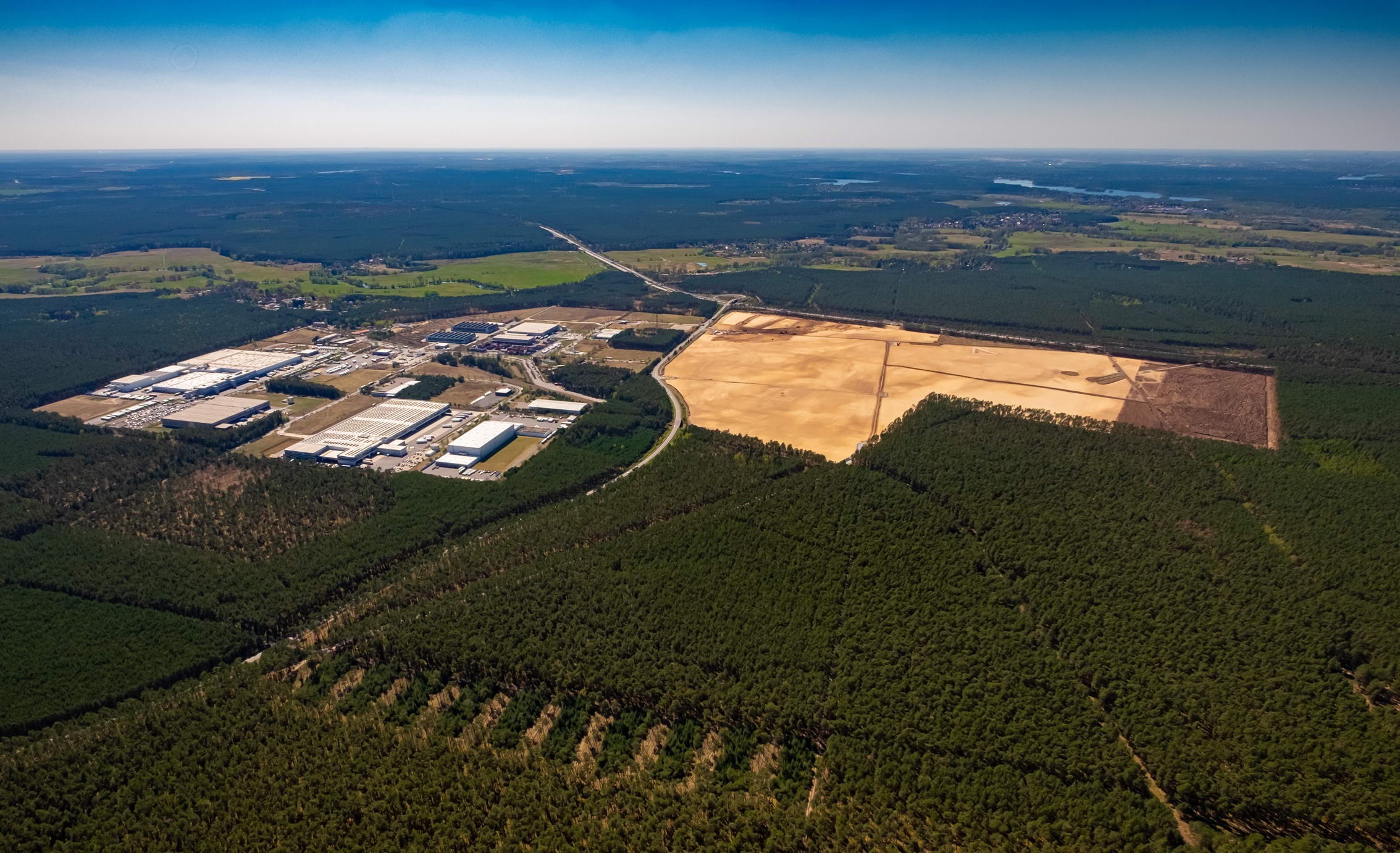
Freienbrink industrial estate and construction site in April 2020

=== Planning and locating (2015–2018) ===
Initial discussion of a Tesla gigafactory in Europe occurred as early as 2015. The factory was then thought to be a combined electric battery manufacturing facility and automobile factory. In 2016, Tesla was anticipating to announce the factory in 2017.

The factory had been occasionally referred to as "Gigafactory 2", before the name was used for Gigafactory New York. By 2017, the Europe Gigafactory was expected to be named either Gigafactory 4 or 5. In November 2019, it became Gigafactory 4 and then Gigafactory Berlin-Brandenburg.

More than ten European countries had campaigned to have the factory located within their jurisdictions.

- In April 2016, a French minister suggested turning the soon to be shuttered Fessenheim Nuclear Power Plant into Gigafactory 2, supported by two ministers.
- The Dutch minister of economic affairs, Henk Kamp, announced plans to attract Tesla later in 2016, and campaigned for the plant at several locations. They promoted the idea of synergy with the European headquarters of Tesla, already located in the Netherlands, which is a finishing plant.
- The Czech Republic near Prague was reported as a possibility in 2016. A nearby 330,000 tonnes (360,000 tons) lithium deposit was thought a relevant factor, at the time.
- Germany's then-federal minister for economic affairs and energy, Sigmar Gabriel, stated that Tesla was in talks with the government during 2015 over a Gigafactory there. Authorities, companies and over 100,000 citizens in the Lower Lusatia region (100 km (62 mi) southeast of Berlin, near the Germany–Poland border) urged Tesla to consider siting a factory in the region, close to the Czech lithium. They suggested the EuroSpeedway Lausitz for drive tests, along with Dekra.
- Portugal pursued the plant in 2016 with an internet campaign and governmental negotiations. Portugal has the largest lithium reserves in Europe.
- Paterna, Spain was also in pursuit of being selected by late 2016.
- Finland's city of Vaasa announced a government supported initiative to attract the factory in 2016, citing both nearby lithium carbonate deposits, a large refinery for cobalt and an annual 50,000-tonne nickel production.
- Lithuania drew the attention of Tesla in January 2017 when the local gaming community united to recreate the potential Gigafactory in Minecraft.
- The Estonian government was also pursuing Tesla to be selected, claiming a good geographical and logistical location, plus 140 MW renewable energy with total control over the pricing for the factory in PAKRI Smart Industrial City at Pakri Peninsula.

There was intense competition among European countries to host the Gigafactory because of its expected significant contribution to the economy. The sprawling facility, which is expected to be one of the largest manufacturing lines in Europe, will need a considerable number of employees despite many highly automated processes. There is also a concerted effort in the region to encourage battery manufacturing since it is viewed as a strategic economic measure due to an increasing global transition towards renewable energy. A 2018 report revealed, for instance, that the world will need at least 25 more gigafactories by 2025. The projected uptick in demand for electric cars and in-home power storage systems is causing concern about a European fuel dependency on Asia, which, as of early 2018, accounted for 88 per cent of global battery manufacturing capacity. By 2018, European governments were providing subsidies and incentives to companies like Tesla as well as local battery manufacturing startups like Northvolt and TerraE to build production infrastructure within its borders. According to Matthias Machnig, state secretary at the German economy ministry:

We are in the center of the biggest and deepest change in the automotive industry since its beginning. We would be naïve to think we can handle battery technology as a commodity that can be bought anywhere in the world.

=== Construction and opening (2019–2021) ===
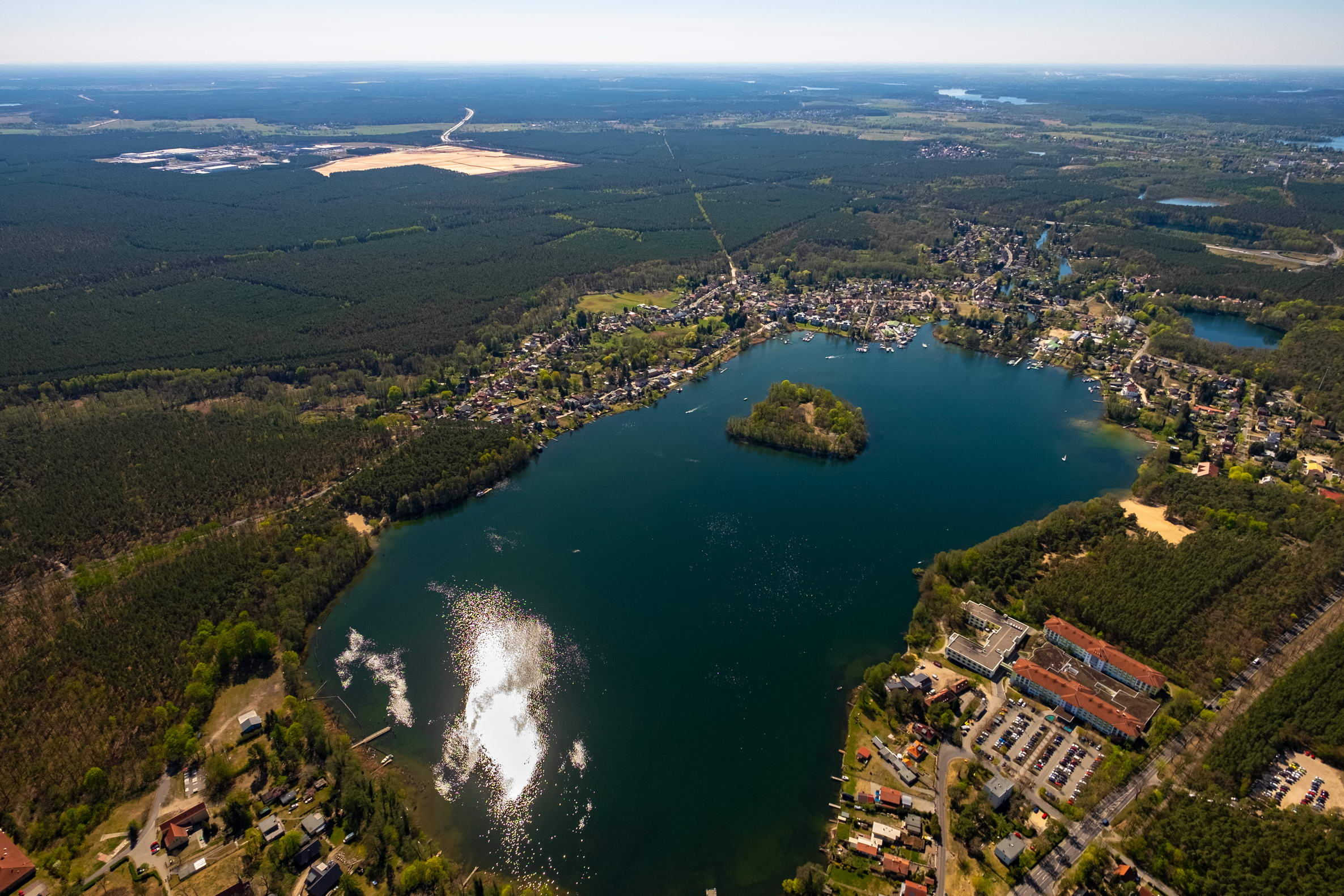
Grünheide, Tesla construction site in the background

On 12 November 2019, the selection of the Brandenburg location for the Gigafactory 4 facility was officially announced by Tesla CEO Elon Musk at the Das Goldene Lenkrad award show, held in Berlin. Giga Berlin is expected to produce batteries, battery packs and powertrains for use in Tesla vehicles. It will also do assembly of the Tesla Model Y, which had been previously announced for Gigafactory 4 in March 2019. Construction of the facility was then planned to begin in early 2020, with a proposed start of production in late 2021. Musk also announced the establishment of a new design and development centre in nearby Berlin.

By February 2020, environmental challenges had been cleared in court decisions which allowed vegetation on the site to begin being cleared.

Construction work had begun by May 2020 with initial foundation work underway, the set up of the first four construction cranes, and the beginning of the arrival of trainloads of building materials including pillars and beams. Musk has stated the construction will come together at an "impossible-seeming speed" due to the use of prefabricated construction techniques.

On 9 October 2021, Tesla held the Gigafactory Berlin-Brandenburg County Fair where they invited 9000 local guests to tour the factory.

=== Approval and production (2022–2025) ===
In March 2022, the government of Brandenburg granted Giga Berlin-Brandenburg its final environmental approval. However, the approval did not give Tesla the capacity to immediately start. On 22 March 2022, Giga Berlin was officially opened. Several protesters gathered outside the facility to raise their concerns. By 29 April, the factory started to produce Model Y Performance with 2170-cells. Later in December it was reported that the company faced issues with filling positions, working conditions, retaining trained employees, and a high level of absenteeism at the factory.

The ramp-up of Gigafactory Berlin has been meticulously tracked and made easily known through Tesla Inc. publicly announcing the factory's achievements once accomplished: On 17 June 2022, Gigafactory Berlin reportedly reached a run rate of 1,000 units per week, and by 25 March 2023, Gigafactory Berlin hit 5,000 units per week. Tesla lowered the production target to 4,350 a week in July and August 2023, and planned to reduce it further. In August 2024, the carmaker was still planning to expand Gigafactory Berlin, which employs nearly 12,000 people, to increase production from an annual 250,000 vehicles to 1 million vehicles per year in the long term; these plans were put on hold, however, as long as market conditions did not improve.

On 19 July 2024, the factory is concerned by the outage due to Crowdstrike software, stopping the operational for few hours. The security software is then removed from the computers.

In August 2025, German media reported that a further expansion of the factory was on hold and that Tesla had still not reached its current goal of 250,000 vehicles produced in Berlin per year, half the facility's full production capacity.

=== Battery cell and Cybercab expansion (2026–) ===
In December 2025, Tesla announced a 4680 battery cell production at the site. In May 2026, Tesla increased its investement by €250 million, bringing the total investment to ca. € 1 billion and the planned annual cell production target to 18 GWh.

In November 2026, Tesla announced a first investment of around € 3 billion into a new manufacturing building at Giga Berlin for the Tesla Cybercab, with an expected start of production in 2029. The new building is planned north of the existing plant, with Tesla calling it the "technologically most advanced Tesla factory in the world."

== Production ==
Gigafactory Berlin-Brandenburg manufactures batteries, battery packs, powertrains and seats with work including casting, stamping, painting, drivetrain assembly and final assembly of Model Y and future models with an annual capacity eventually reaching 500,000 cars. Initial production was planned to be of the Tesla Model Y. The expected cost for the factory was around €4 billion.

== Site ==
The campus is 35 kilometres (20 mi) south-east of central Berlin on the Berlin–Wrocław railway, which forms the north border of the site between Erkner station and Fangschleuse railway station; and the A10 motorway, which forms the west border.

Extending north from the 1-square-kilometre (0.4 sq mi) "GVZ Freienbrink" logistics centre, the area was an undeveloped 3-square-kilometre (1.2 sq mi) greenfield land site designated industrial zone. In 2000 it was offered as location for a BMW car factory, but BMW-Werk Leipzig in Saxony was chosen. Much larger pine meadows in a landscape-scale conservation surround Freienbrink and a state-owned man-made forest of low-quality monoculture harvest-ready planted pine trees occupied the site, and authorities expected Tesla to mitigate felling by planting new trees of more diverse variety. 160 hectares of vegetation was cleared for the factory, and by 2022, 265 hectares of new multiple-species forest had been planted elsewhere. The pines are planned to be reforested with additional species.

Old ordnance complicated site clearing, and seven bombs (85 kg total) were detonated in a controlled explosion in January 2020. The site also interrupts the route of the Old Postal Road (Grünheide Alte Poststraße). The environmental report indicated that the ground is valley sand, and contains some pollution with heavy metals.

Purchase contract on the land was expected to be completed in December 2019. In December 2019, Tesla clarified an expected European Gigafactory production rate of approximately 500,000 vehicles per year. Tesla was to pay €13.50 per square metre for the 300-hectare (740-acre) site, to the sum of ~€41 million. In January 2020, German media reported that Tesla had approved the contract to buy the land for €41 million; Tesla signed the contract and the state notarized the contract on 29 January 2020.

=== Logistics ===
The current water supply (from Strausberg-Erkner) is sufficient for the first phase of a quarter million cars, but the second (to half a million cars) and third (to 3–4 million cars) phases need further water supply. Water purification is to be supplied by distillation and reverse osmosis. Additional facilities will include a waste water treatment plant with a capacity of 252 cubic metres per hour (8,900 cu ft/h), a central supply building, an area for in- and outgoing deliveries (rail and truck) as well as employee parking lots. Niederbarnimer Eisenbahn began operating a free 400-seat Bombardier Talent diesel shuttle train between Fangschleuse station and the factory in September 2023.

Some of the reasons for choosing Brandenburg were that the industrial site is expandable, the state has the highest production of green power per citizen in Germany, and there are qualified workers in the area. Suppliers also set up facilities in the area.

=== Location concerns ===
The project is subject to a number of concerns, including potential impacts to the water supply and local wildlife, and about proper wastewater disposal. In the public hearing in Stadthalle Erkner protesters were concerned that the chemicals in the factory pose a violation of the AwSV §49, which means that the plans for the factory must be stopped. Among the forest residents are reptiles, ants and birds which must be relocated before felling. There may be an endangered species of bat; the district forester who planted trees says the bats prefer trees older than 80 years to roost in them.

A group of neighbouring municipalities formed in December 2019 to handle issues like traffic, infrastructure and residential developments.

Unexploded WWII-era bombs are commonly found in German soil, and seven bombs (85 kg total) were removed from the site in January 2020. Additional bombs were found during the expansion phase in 2024.

On 9 April 2020, Potsdamer Neueste Nachrichten (PNN) reported that the soil in the foundation area is sandy, requiring a different type of foundation than what was planned. According to the report, the changes are not simple. Tesla will need to update their application with the local government, probably requiring a public hearing.

On 15 October 2020, Associated Press reported that the German utility company WSE was shutting off water to the construction site due to unpaid bills. The bill was paid and the water was restored the next day.

== Incidents ==
In 2021, the left-wing extremist group Vulkangruppe claimed responsibility for an arson attack on a transmitter tower at the construction site of the planned Tesla Gigafactory Berlin-Brandenburg, accusing Tesla of being neither environmentally sustainable nor socially just.

On 26 September 2022, a fire broke out at the factory after 800 m^{3} (1,050 yd^{3}) of cardboard and wood caught fire in the factory's recycling facility. The fire brigades of the municipality of Grünheide were called at 3:33 a.m. by the Tesla plant fire brigade. 50 firefighters were dispatched, which fought the fire until close to 8:00 am. No injuries were reported. Criticisms came from groups opposing the factory construction, such as the citizens' initiatives and the Strausberg Erkner Water Board (WSE), which called for an immediate stop of Giga Berlin's vehicle production.

At the end of September, the German weekly magazine Stern started an investigative report series "Inside Tesla" that raised serious concerns against Tesla and Brandenburg politicians. Accusations included a high number of serious violations of occupational health and safety and environmental regulations. The reports cited three times as many emergencies occurred at Grünheide as compared to the similarly-sized Audi factory in Ingolstadt.

In March 2024, production at the plant was temporarily halted following a suspected arson attack on a nearby electricity substation, which was later claimed by Vulkangruppe.

Protestors against the proposed expansion of the factory began assembling near the factory in early February 2024. A camp belonging to the Stop Tesla initiative formed and activists built treehouses as an encampment tactic. After a second camp coalesced in the woodlands adjacent to the factory, the participants planned a five-day protest for early May 2024. Tesla learned of the event and temporarily closed the factory in anticipation. During the protest, dozens of activists stormed the factory grounds and clashed with police.

== Labor relations ==
As of October 2023, according to Brandenburg's Minister of Health Ursula Nonnemacher, Gigafactory Berlin-Brandenburg employs 11,500 people. The labor union IG Metall stated more than 1,000 employees have jointly demanded improved working conditions in a first-time campaign at the Grünheide factory and numerous Tesla employees have complained about poor working conditions. The workers criticized the workload as "extreme" due to short cycle times, a lack of personnel and excessive production targets. Employees also pointed to serious deficiencies in health protection, which led to sickness rates of up to around 30 percent and a high number of work accidents. When the union put up stickers in 2023 that read, "Our health is more important than the next billion to Elon," Tesla warned of disciplinary action that included termination without notice.

In mid-June 2023, the Business Insider reported that the Tesla factory in Grünheide had reduced special shifts in the second quarter. The number of regular work shifts in the factory were also reduced from three to two and a half. Insider sources alleged that hundreds of temporary positions in the factory faced lay-offs.

== Opposition ==
As of 2024, the local Alternative for Germany (AfD) opposes Tesla's expansion plan.

== See also ==
- List of Tesla factories
