= Grünheide (Mark) =

- Municipality
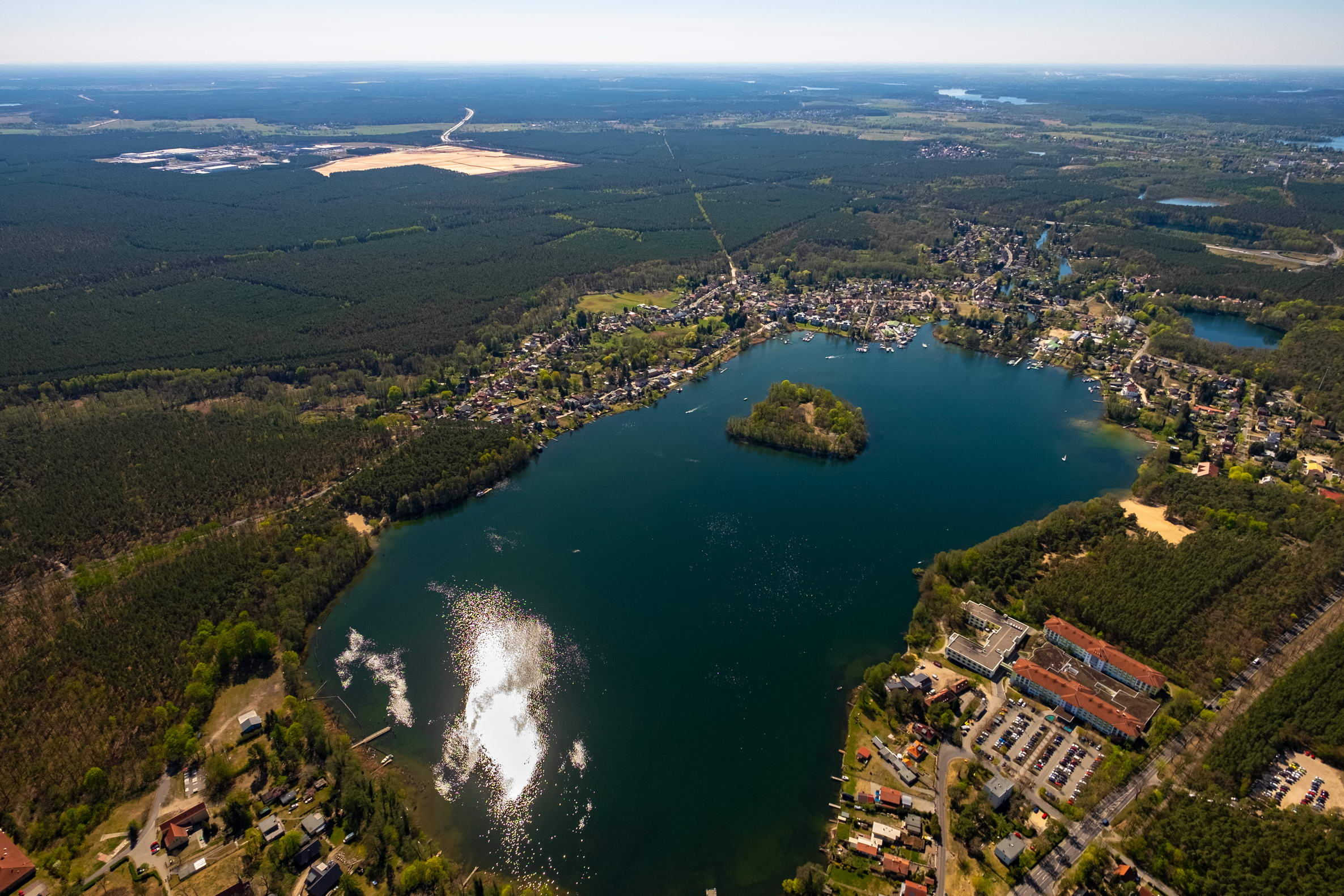
- View over Grünheide with Lake Werlsee, Giga Berlin (Tesla construction site) in the background

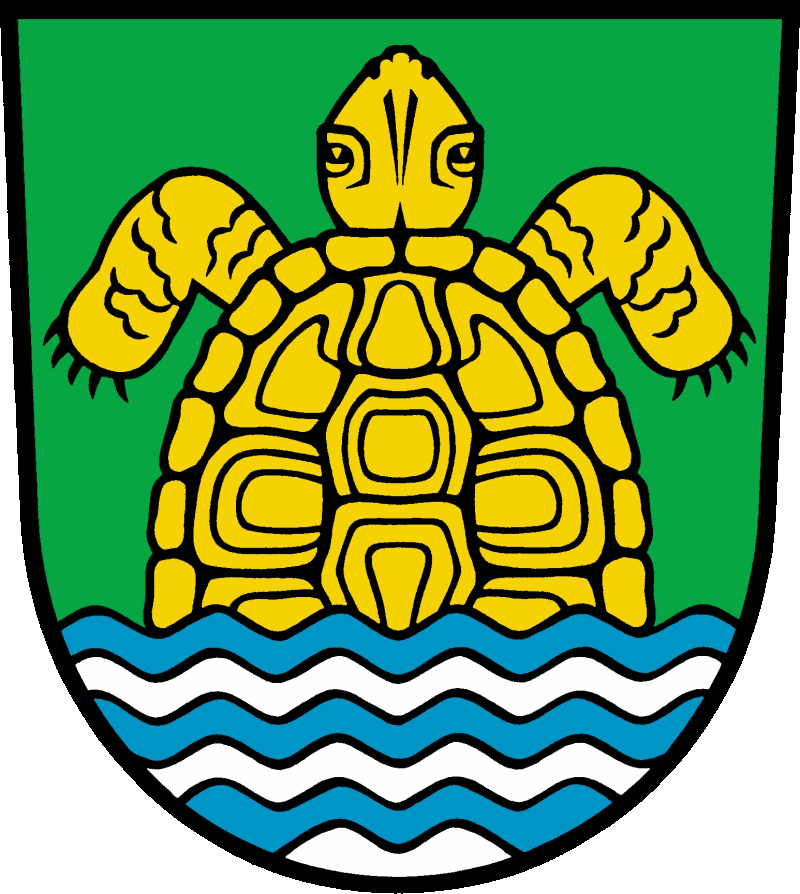
- Coat of arms

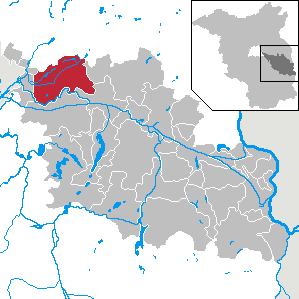
- Location of Grünheide (Mark) within Oder-Spree district
- Interactive map of Grünheide (Mark)
- Location within Germany Location within Brandenburg
- Coordinates: 52°25′N 13°49′E
- Country: Germany
- State: Brandenburg
- District: Oder-Spree
- Subdivisions: 6 districts

Government
  - Mayor (2019–27): Arne Christiani (Ind.)

Area
  - Total: 126.9 km^{2} (49.0 sq mi)
- Elevation: 35 m (115 ft)

Population (2025-12-31)
  - Total: 8,997
  - Density: 70.90/km^{2} (183.6/sq mi)
- Time zone: UTC+01:00 (CET)
  - Summer (DST): UTC+02:00 (CEST)
- Postal codes: 15537
- Dialling codes: 03362
- Vehicle registration: LOS
- Website: www.gemeinde-gruenheide.de

Grünheide (Mark) (German pronunciation: [ˈɡʁyːnˌhaɪdə]) is a municipality in the Oder-Spree District, in Brandenburg, Germany. It is situated 30 kilometres south-east of Berlin city centre, on the River Löcknitz. In 2020 Tesla, Inc. began to build Gigafactory Berlin-Brandenburg in Grünheide near the Autobahn A10.

== Etymology ==
The name "Grünheide" is a compound of grün (green) and Heide (heath). Mark means march (see March of Brandenburg). The Mark suffix is added to distinguish Grünheide (Mark) from Grünheide (Dettmannsdorf), Grünheide (Oberuckersee) and Grünheide (Auerbach/Vogtl.).

== History ==
The Grünheider area was a settlement area of Germanic tribes early on. Until the Reformation, all districts (except Hangelsberg) of today's community of Grünheide belonged to the Rüdersdorfer property of the Zinna Abbey. This property was administered from Kagel (Grünheide) for a long time. The term "Green Heyde" was first used by Prince-elector Joachim II, who in 1543 granted his brother Margrave Johann von Brandenburg-Küstrin hunting lodge on an island in the Werlsee and rights to hunt.

The Thirty Years War completely depopulated the area. It was not until 1662 that Friedrich Wilhelm, the Great Elector, approved the settlement of a sawmill. Therefore, 1662 is considered to be the founding year of Grünheide, although Klein Wall appears in the Rüdersdorfer church book as early as 1642. Since 1933, a fieldstone monument below the church commemorates the founder of the place, Elector Joachim II. Between 1748 and 1763 King Friedrich II settled numerous small farmers and woodcutters in so-called colonies.

The making of the Löcknitz navigable in 1875 and the connection to the railway network via the nearby station Fangschleuse helped Grünheide to an upswing. Numerous wealthy Berlin citizens built large summer houses on the banks of Peetzsee and Werlsee. Among others Gerhart Hauptmann, Bertolt Brecht, Wilhelm Bölsche and Ernst Rowohlt spent the summer months in and near Grünheide.

Initially, Grünheide belonged to the III. Heath district of the Rüdersdorfer forest district. From 1889 the place was called Werlsee municipality, which was renamed Grünheide (Mark) on 16 July 1934.

In Grünheide the company vacation camp "Alexander Matrossow" was built by the VEB IFA-Automobilwerke Ludwigsfelde and after 1990 as' 'Children's and youth recreation Störitzland' continued. There was also a holiday camp in Altbuchhorst, which was operated by the GDR printing and publishing industry.

== Geography ==
Grünheide lies in the northwest of the Oder-Spree District (German: Landkreis Oder-Spree, Lower Sorbian: Wokrejs Odra-Sprjewja; seat: Beeskow (Lower Sorbian: Bezkow)), directly bordering the Märkisch-Oderland District (seat: Seelow) to the north. Grünheide is clockwise surrounded by the municipalities of Rehfelde, Müncheberg, Steinhöfel, Fürstenwalde/Spree, Spreenhagen, Gosen-Neu Zittau, Erkner, Woltersdorf (bei Berlin), and Rüdersdorf bei Berlin.

Woltersdorf (bei Berlin), Erkner and Gosen-Neu Zittau directly border the southeasternmost localities of Berlin: Rahnsdorf, Müggelheim and Schmöckwitz, all of them belonging to the borough of Treptow-Köpenick (see boroughs and neighborhoods of Berlin).

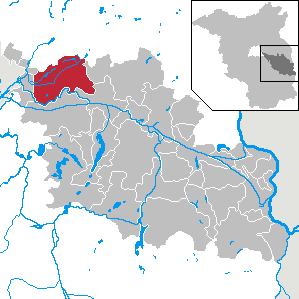
Location of Grünheide (Mark) within the Oder-Spree District

=== Division of the town ===
Grünheide consists of the following districts:

- Grünheide (Mark) with the villages Grünheide, Alt Buchhorst, Bergluch, Gottesbrück and Fangschleuse
- Hangelsberg
- Kagel
- Kienbaum
- Mönchwinkel
- Spreeau

== Demography ==
Population change comparison: Grünheide (Mark) versus Brandenburg state (1875–present)]. The development of the Grünheide (Mark) population since 1875 within the current boundaries (blue line) and its comparison to the population development of Brandenburg state (dotted line). Also illustrated is the population during the time of Nazi rule (grey background) and during the time of Communist rule (red background).

Recent Population Development and Projections (Population Development before Census 2011 (blue line); Recent Population Development according to the Census in Germany in 2011 (blue bordered line); Official projections for 2005-2030 (yellow line); for 2017-2030 (scarlet line); for 2020-2030 (green line)

Grünheide (Mark): Population development
within the current boundaries (2020)

Year	Pop.	±% p.a.
1875	2,441	—
1890	2,412	−0.08%
1910	3,351	+1.66%
1925	4,157	+1.45%
1939	5,411	+1.90%
1950	5,825	+0.67%
1964	6,347	+0.61%

Year	Pop.	±% p.a.
1971	6,350	+0.01%
1981	6,143	−0.33%
1985	6,006	−0.56%
1990	5,733	−0.93%
1995	6,186	+1.53%
2000	7,272	+3.29%
2005	7,761	+1.31%

Year	Pop.	±% p.a.
2010	7,982	+0.56%
2015	8,327	+0.85%
2016	8,448	+1.45%
2017	8,554	+1.25%
2018	8,645	+1.06%
2019	8,755	+1.27%
2020	8,872	+1.34%

== Economy and infrastructure ==
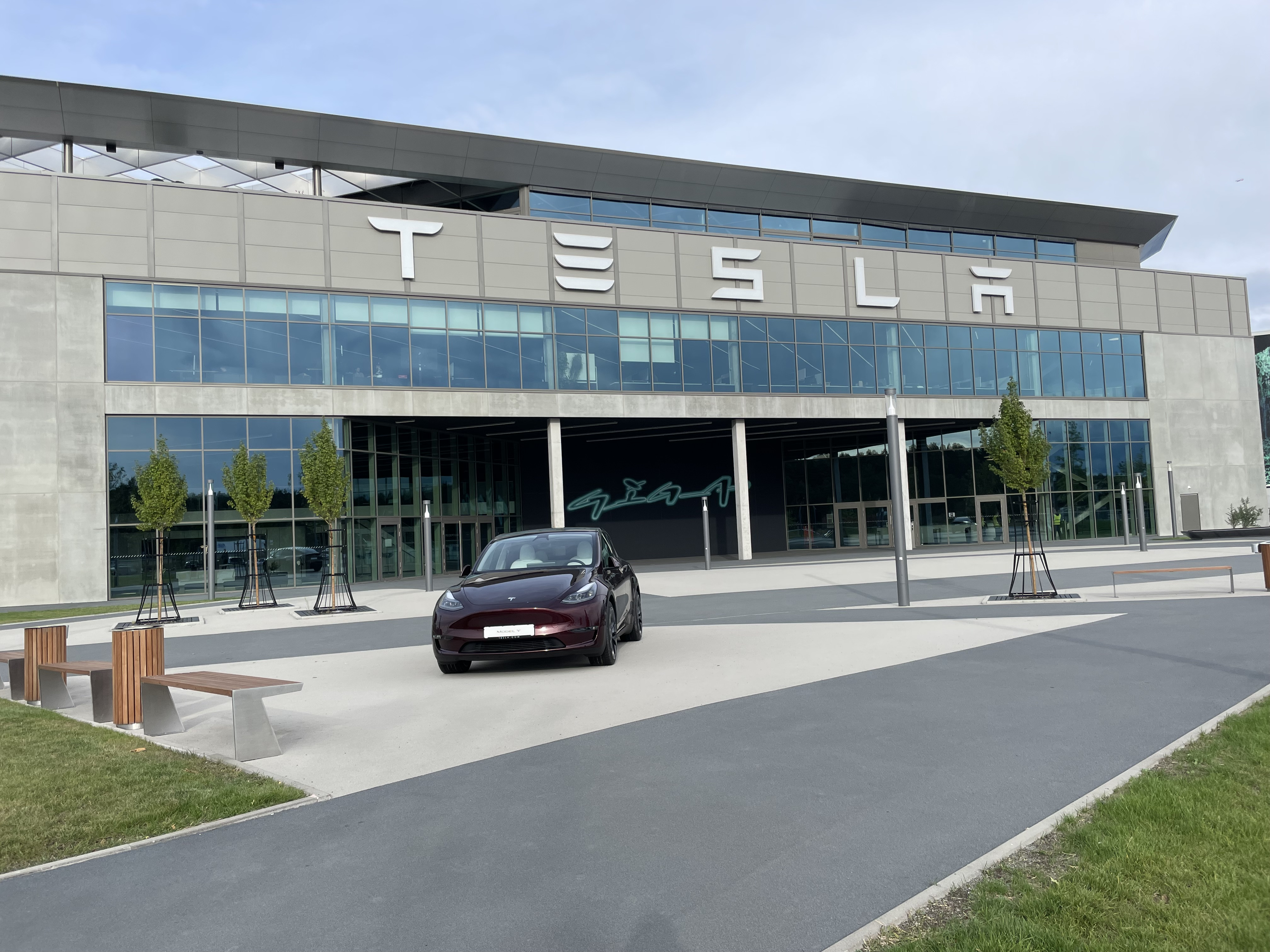
Gigafactory Berlin-Brandenburg

=== Business ===
Tesla Gigafactory Berlin-Brandenburg is located in Grünheide.

=== Transport ===
- Fangschleuse train station
- Autobahn A10
- Berlin Brandenburg Airport is located near Grünheide

== Personalities ==
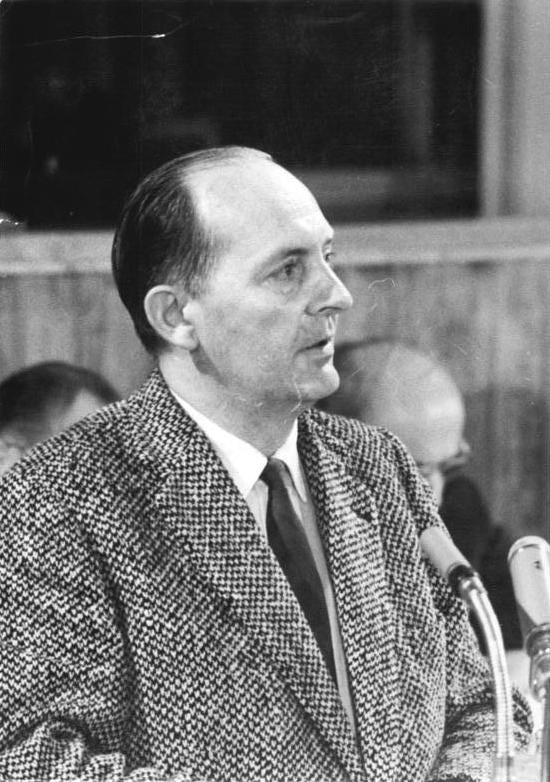
Robert Havemann Berlin Volkskammer in 1960

- Curt Herrmann (1854-1929), Impressionist, lived in the mansion with a tower in the village part of the Hangelsberg from the year 1750.
- Fritz Rasp (1891-1976), actor, lived during his time in Berlin in his own house in what is today's Mönchwinkel.
- Robert Havemann (1910-1982), chemist, communist, a resistance fighter against the National Socialism and Critical Critic in the GDR. Havemann lived in his house in today's district of Grünheide from 1976 to 1979 because of his criticism of the SED

== See also ==
- Baberowsee
- Peetzsee
