= Tesla Automation =

German engineering automation company

Coordinates: 50°12′51″N 6°26′51″E

Tesla Automation GmbH
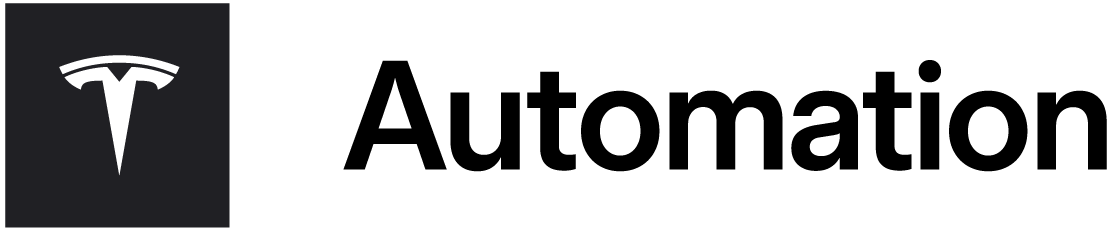
- Formerly: Grohmann Engineering GmbH (1963–2017); Tesla Grohmann Automation GmbH (2017-2020)
- Type: Subsidiary
- Industry: Engineering
- Founded: 1963; 63 years ago
- Founder: Klaus Grohmann
- Headquarters: Prüm, Germany
- Key people: Lothar Thommes; Michael Meens; Stephan Werkman
- Number of employees: 1390 (2024)
- Parent: Tesla, Inc. (2017–present)
- Website: teslaautomation.de/en/

Tesla Automation GmbH (formerly Grohmann Engineering GmbH) is a German engineering automation company based in Prüm in the state of Rhineland-Palatinate. The company has branch locations in Neutraubling, Bavaria; Neuwied, Rhineland-Palatinate; and Reutlingen, Baden-Württemberg. The company was founded in 1983 by Klaus Grohmann and acquired by Tesla, Inc., in January 2017. Klaus Grohmann was ousted after clashing with Tesla CEO Elon Musk.

The product portfolio includes machinery for the production of microprocessors and memory chips, airbag sensors and power steering controllers, as well as systems for the production of car door and roof seals, lithium-ion battery cells and modules. Among other things, the company manufactures robotics that are used in the production of batteries and electronics.

The firm works closely with universities within dual track studies of mechanical engineering and robotic process automation. In addition, it provides training in the field of technical product design, industrial mechanics, CNC operation, construction technology, IT, mechatronics and industrial electronic technology.

== History ==
Grohmann Engineering was founded by Klaus Grohmann in 1963. It moved its headquarters to Prüm in 1983.

In November 2016, the privately held company agreed to be acquired by the American automotive company Tesla Motors. At the time, 74.9% of the company was owned by Klaus Grohmann and 25.1% was owned by the Deutsche Beteiligungs AG. At the time, the company had 700 employees, with annual revenues of about €120 million. The deal was completed on 3 January 2017, at which point the company employed 800 people. According to a May 2017 SEC filing, Tesla paid $109.5 million in cash for the company, and in addition paid $25.8 million for a new incentive compensation agreement.

In April 2017, founder Klaus Grohmann left the company due to a dispute with Tesla CEO Elon Musk. Musk demanded the company halt production for competitors, such as BMW and Daimler AG, to focus on the Model 3.

In early 2025, the subsidiary agreed to acquire 300 employees and some of the assets of Manz, a battery production equipment maker in Reutlingen.

== Union issues ==
By discontinuing business relations with all customers except Tesla, the company's trade union was concerned with wage levels and with jobs in the long term if electric cars did not have the expected success. Tesla then offered Grohmann employees a raise of 150 euros per month and employee stock options worth $10,000 with a payout over the following four years, as well as a one-time cash payment of 1000 euros. Tesla did not comment on the works agreement. In October 2017, the company agreed with union representatives on a competitive pay structure. According to the chairman of the works council, the future remuneration was at the level of the collective agreement valid for the industry.
