= Tesla Fremont Factory =

Tesla, Inc. factory

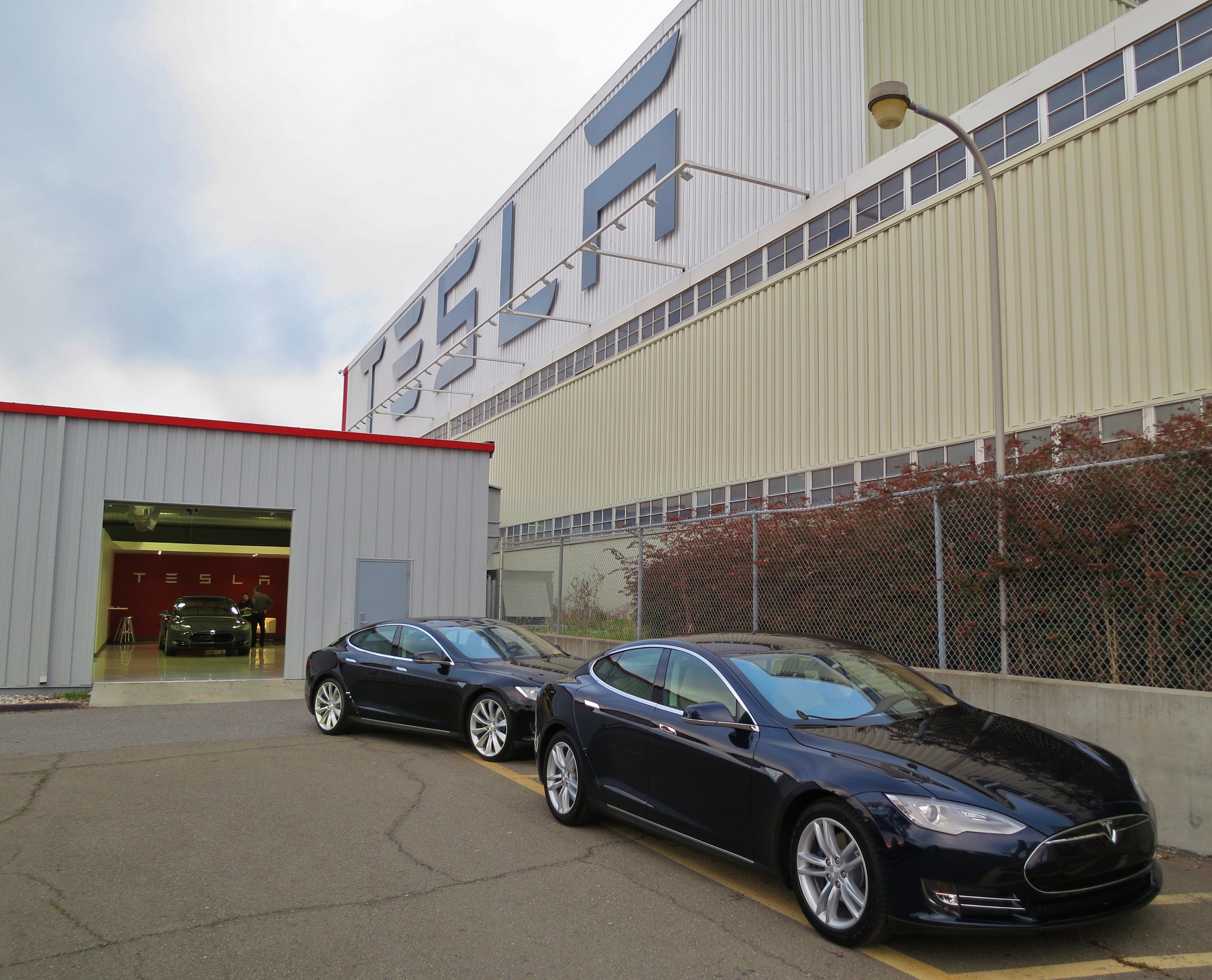
- Tesla Model S vehicles at the Fremont Factory
- Built: 1962 (as Fremont Assembly)
- Operated: 2010–present
- Location: 45500 Fremont Boulevard; Fremont, California, United States
- Coordinates: 37°29′42″N 121°56′33″W
- Industry: Automotive
- Products: Model 3; Model Y; Optimus
- Employees: 22,000
- Area: 0.68 sq mi (1.8 km^{2}; 440 acres)
- Owner: Tesla, Inc.
- Website: tesla.com/fremont-factory

The Tesla Fremont Factory is an automobile manufacturing plant in Fremont, California, United States, operated by Tesla, Inc. The factory originally opened as General Motors' Fremont Assembly in 1962, and then was operated by New United Motor Manufacturing, Inc. (NUMMI), a joint venture of GM and Toyota from 1984. The joint venture ended when GM entered bankruptcy in 2009. In 2010, Toyota agreed to sell the plant to Tesla at a significant discount. The plant was formerly the production site of the Model S and Model X—both discontinued—and also produces the Model 3, and Model Y.

In 2023, the Fremont Factory produced nearly 560,000 vehicles and employed over 20,000 people. Tesla says the factory has the capacity to produce up to 100,000 Model S and X vehicles and 550,000 Model 3 and Y vehicles annually.

== Background ==
Tesla had planned to build a factory in Albuquerque, New Mexico, a central location for shipping. Construction was supposed to begin in April 2007, but was canceled. The company later announced a greenfield factory would be built in nearby San Jose, California. However, the cost of both projects was prohibitive, and the company looked for alternatives.

An opportunity presented itself in 2010 when Toyota was looking to sell the NUMMI plant in Fremont. NUMMI had been operated as a joint venture between Toyota and General Motors from 1984 until GM filed for bankruptcy in 2009. NUMMI yearly production peaked at 428,633 vehicles in 2006. Prior to NUMMI, the facility was the GM Fremont Assembly from 1962 to 1982. Efforts were made in 2009 to keep the facility in use: the state offered incentives to Toyota, other automakers including Tesla toured the facility, and a stadium was considered, but none of them succeeded. In 2010 the mayor of Fremont viewed the site as dead.

During its 2009 tour, Tesla initially dismissed the NUMMI site for being too big and costly for the then fledgling automaker. However, the company was able to reach a deal with Toyota to pay $42 million for most of the site, significantly under market value. As part of the agreement, Toyota would also purchase $50 million of common stock when Tesla held its IPO the next month. In exchange, Tesla agreed to partner with Toyota on the "development of electric vehicles, parts, and production system and engineering support." Under the agreement, Tesla would go on to create the electric powertrain for the second-generation Toyota RAV4 EV. The two companies would later end their partnership in 2017.

On April 1, 2010, NUMMI produced its last car. All of the factory equipment was sold at auction, with robots and tooling being purchased by Toyota's plants in Kentucky, Texas and Mississippi. NUMMI sold some equipment to Tesla for $15 million, a significant discount compared to new equipment.

Tesla officially took possession of the site on October 19, 2010, and started work inside on October 27. The state of California awarded Tesla $15 million in tax credits if employment and investment goals were met. The first retail delivery of the Tesla Model S took place during a special event at the factory on June 22, 2012.

== Facilities ==
The plant is located in the South Fremont District next to the Mud Slough between the Warm Springs BART station and the California State Route 262 connecting Interstate 880 and Interstate 680.

Tesla only purchased 210 of the 370 acres owned by NUMMI. When Tesla first moved into the plant, it was about 10 times the size the company needed and much of the activity at the site was concentrated inside the 5,500,000-square-foot (510,000 m^{2}) main final assembly building.

In addition to the equipment Tesla purchased from NUMMI, the company also purchased a Schuler hydraulic stamping press from a Detroit-based auto industry supplier, worth $50 million new, for $6 million, including shipping costs.

Various parts of the NUMMI plant were planned to be modified to support Tesla vehicle production. For example, the passenger vehicle paint equipment was to be extensively modified through late 2011; converted from solvents to BASF water-based paint. Two paint lines (one car body, one component) were constructed from 2015. By 2014, half of the factory area was in use.

The floors, walls and ceiling are painted white with skylights and high-efficiency lighting to create an environment similar to a laboratory, and the production environment is cleaner and quieter than at NUMMI.

Union Pacific Railroad had tracks running into the plant which had been used during NUMMI-era to carry finished cars. All rail connections were subsequently removed, with the sidings used for more factory facilities. In July 2013, Tesla acquired an adjacent 35-acre property from Union Pacific Railroad for a test track.

Tesla built a casting foundry in Lathrop in 2015 supporting the Fremont production, and leased 1.3 million sq ft of warehouses in nearby Livermore in 2017.

In 2016, there were 4,500 parking spaces, and Tesla purchased a neighboring 25-acre site from Lennar. In August 2017, Tesla won approval from the Fremont City Council to double the size of the facility with about 4.6 million new square feet of space. Tesla also planned to expand production capacity five-fold to 500,000 vehicles per year by 2018, or 10,000 units per week.

As of early 2019, the facility has 511,000 m^{2} (5,500,000 ft^{2}) of floor space.

== Employees ==
Tesla started production with 1,000 workers. By 2013, this had risen to 3,000, and to 6,000 people in June 2016. In 2016, preparing for Model 3 production, Tesla planned to increase their work force to about 9,000 people. In fall of 2017, Tesla employed some 10,000 at the Fremont plant, a number still being shared in June 2018. As of 2022, the factory employed about 22,000 people.

In addition to Tesla employees, the company uses contractors for various functions. In May 2018, Elon Musk, in an apparent goal of reducing dead weight and raising efficiency and quality within its operation, decided to cut contractors and sub-contractors, ordering staff to justify and personally vouch for contractors worth keeping.

== Production ==
When Tesla purchased the Fremont Factory, it was preparing to build the Tesla Model S, a full-sized luxury sedan. Previously the company had assembled its Roadster in an old Chevrolet dealership in Menlo Park. However the Roadster bodies came to California as gliders after being built by Lotus Cars in England.

To learn the skills necessary to create vehicles from scratch, in 2010, Tesla started hand-assembly of 20 Model S vehicles at its "alpha workshop" inside its Palo Alto headquarters building. In 2011, Tesla transitioned to 50 "beta builds", production-validation vehicles built entirely at the Fremont Factory. These cars would also be used for system integration, engineering testing, and federal crash-testing and certification. Tesla expected to produce about 5,000 Model S sedans in 2012, and 20,000 in 2013 if necessary. The first retail delivery of the Model S took place during a special event held at the Tesla Factory on June 22, 2012. Production increased from 15 to 20 cars per week in August 2012 to over 200 by November 5 and 400 by late December. In late December Tesla revised their 2012 delivery projections down to 2,500 cars.

Deliveries reached 6,892 units in the last three months of 2013. In December 2013, California announced it would give Tesla a US$34.7 million tax break to expand production by an estimated 35,000 vehicles annually from its Fremont, California plant.

Tesla announced that weekly production was expected to increase from 600 cars in early 2014 to about 1,000 by year-end. Tesla produced 7,535 units during the first quarter of 2014 and expected to produce 8,500 to 9,000 cars in the second quarter of 2014. As of early May 2014, the production rate was 700 cars per week.

As of 2015, about 1,000 cars were made per week, mostly to pre-orders. Musk says they averaged around 20 changes to the S per week.

Production of the Model X started during 2015, following a short reconfiguration of the production line in July 2014. The first Model X that didn't need corrections was made in April 2016. Tesla moved some of the equipment to their Tilburg final assembly plant in the Netherlands in 2015.

On July 2, 2015, Tesla announced that it had delivered a total of 21,537 vehicles in the first half of the year. All vehicles were manufactured at the Fremont plant.

In May 2016 Tesla raised $1.46 billion in stock, of which $1.26 billion is to prepare production of the Model 3 scheduled for late 2017. Changing from serially producing the Model S and X to the mass production of Model 3 is viewed by experts as a significant step. Tesla stated in May 2016 that it does not have that capability and needs to acquire it, which it partly did with the acquisition of Grohmann Automation in 2016 and purchase of mass production equipment. Whereas the Roadster was delayed by 9 months, the Model S more than six months, and the Model X more than 18 months, analysts estimated in December 2016 that the Model 3 production preparation was on schedule for the second half of 2017.

On August 3, 2016, Tesla announced that it was consistently producing 2,000 vehicles per week. About 2,500 workers operate in the day shift and 2,000 on the night shift.

Tesla makes many parts itself, which is unusual in the auto business. Tesla also works with 300 suppliers around the world, of which 50 are in Northern California, and 10 in the San Francisco Bay Area. Tesla's dashboard supplier SAS rents a 142,188-square-foot building near the factory, beginning in January 2017 with 200 employees. Other suppliers that have opened facilities in the area to be close to Tesla include Eclipse Automation and Futuris Automotive Group. Tesla produces many of its seats at its own seat factory a few miles south of the main factory.

In 2020, due to the COVID-19 pandemic, Tesla implemented virus mitigation efforts in its Shanghai and Fremont factories. Shanghai resumed production on February 10, while the Fremont and New York factories were to reduce activity by March 24. On May 9, Tesla sued Alameda County in order to force the reopening of the Fremont Factory. Tesla told its employees that it had received approval to restart production in the week beginning May 18, and the lawsuit was dropped on May 20.

As other factories reduced production during the COVID pandemic, the Fremont factory became the plant with the highest weekly production in North America at the end of 2021. Elon Musk announced at the 2021 Shareholder Meeting, October 7, 2021, that Tesla hoped to increase the production capacity at the Fremont Factory by 50% in the next couple of years.

== Manufacturing process ==
=== Overview ===
Tesla is highly vertically integrated and develops many components for its vehicles in-house, including batteries and motors. This is in contrast to many traditional automakers, who outsource many manufacturing steps. Design engineers also work at the factory itself, rather than a separate facility. Individual vehicles take between three and five days to complete the assembly process.

=== Drive unit construction ===
==== Motor construction ====
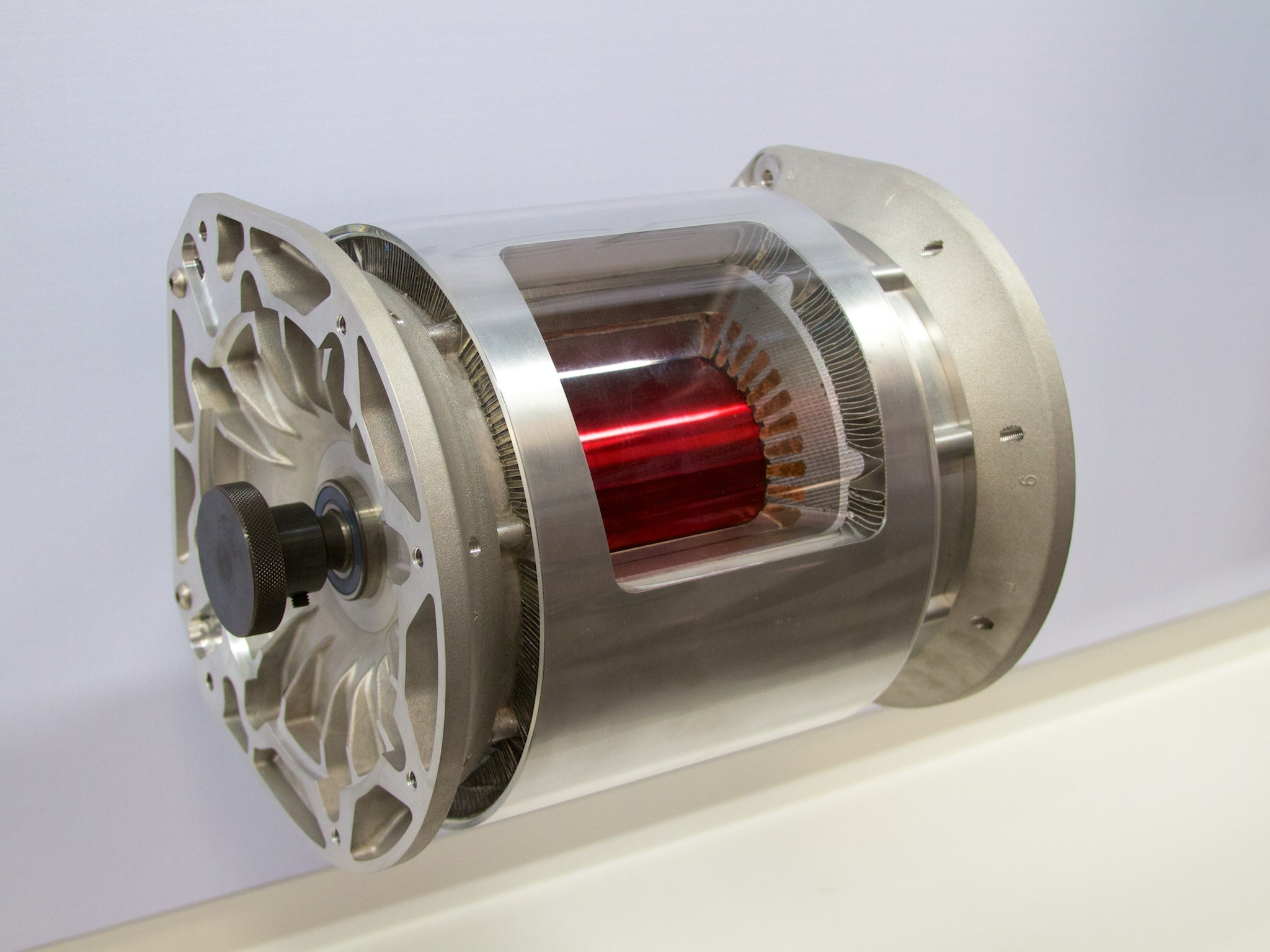
A complete Tesla Model S alternating current electric motor that has had a section removed from the stator to show the rotor inside

The alternating current induction motor used in vehicles are built by Tesla. The motors used in the Model S and X are built in-house at the Fremont Factory. The motors used in the Model 3 and Model Y are built at Tesla's Gigafactory Nevada and shipped to Fremont.

The main components of the motor are the stator and rotor. The motor construction begins when a robot unspools and winds over 1/2 mile (0.80 km) of copper wire per motor. It then pulls the copper wire into a stack. The motor has three phases and so requires three coils of copper. A worker then lengthens and straightens each bundle of wire and inserts a hydraulic lift to transfer the motor to the next station.

A worker insulates each bundle of copper wire in a plastic sleeve to prevent the bundles from touching one another. The ends of the bundles are then snipped to the correct length. Lugs are added and crimped to form attachment points for the motor's three phases. A specialized automatic sewing machine then binds the coils together to keep them in place, the increased tightness of the binding provided by a robotic sewing machine increases the efficiency of the motor. The stator is then encased in a two part epoxy resin to help in evenly distributing the motor's heat. The stator is now complete and is inserted into a heated metal case, locking the stator inside as the case cools. A worker uses a hoisting system to insert the rotor inside the stator completing the construction of the motor.

===== Additional drive unit components =====
A worker then installs the differential and other sections of the gearbox, attaching it together using bolts. An air leak test is then conducted. The three-phase tri-pole power inverter is then installed onto the top of the motor to convert direct current from the battery into alternating current for the motor to use. The motor then undergoes a series of automated tests taking 4 minutes to ensure correct function, and then is moved to the general assembly area to be installed into the car.

The power inverter is constructed from metal–oxide–semiconductor (MOS) power transistors. Early Tesla vehicles used MOS-controlled insulated-gate bipolar transistors (IGBTs), which have been replaced by silicon carbide (SiC) power MOSFETs (MOS field-effect transistors) in later Tesla vehicles since 2018.

=== Battery pack construction ===
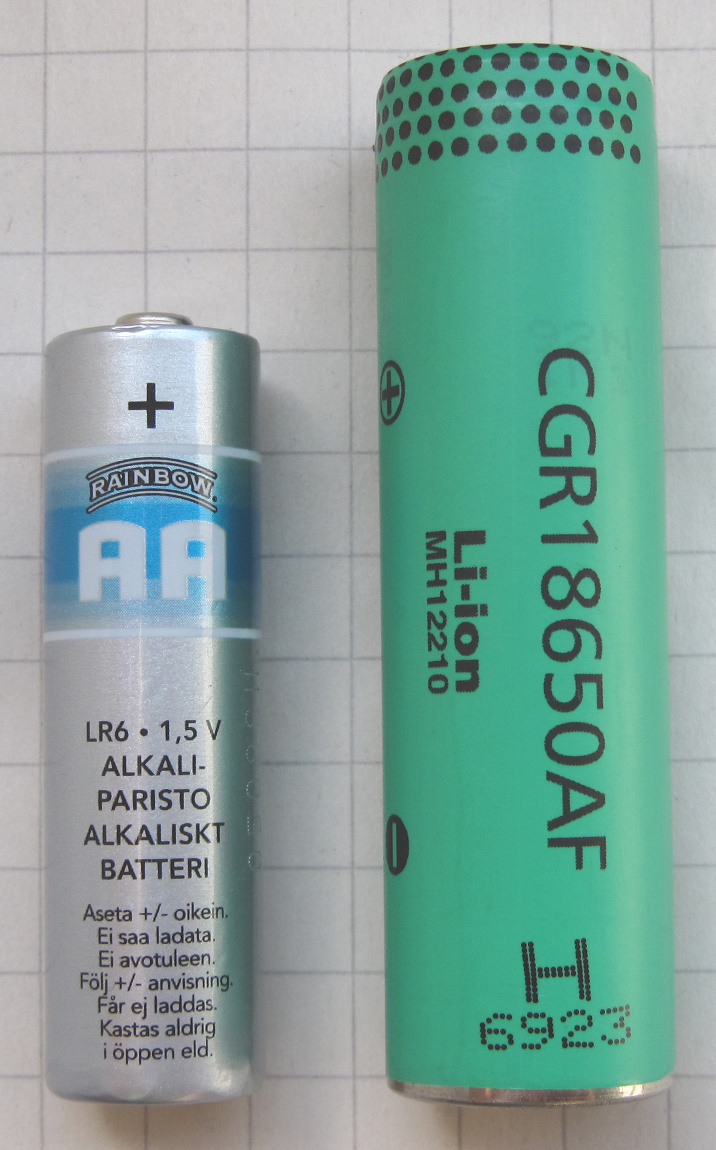
The Model S and X use thousands of 18650-type cylindrical lithium-ion battery cells (right). A smaller AA battery is on the left for scale.

The Model S and X battery packs are assembled in-house at the Fremont Factory using battery cells from Japan. Battery cells for the Model 3 and Y are made on-site at Tesla's Gigafactory Nevada and assembled into battery packs before being shipped to Fremont. Both battery pack types are liquid-cooled and contain an intumescent fire prevention chemical.

The battery packs for the Model S and X contain thousands of 18650-type cylindrical lithium-ion battery cells with nickel-cobalt-aluminum cathodes. Tesla sources these batteries with a nickel-cobalt-aluminum (NCA) cathode chemistry from Panasonic's factories in Japan. The 18650 is a commodity cell, previously used in laptops and other consumer electronics, which stands in contrast to every other electric vehicle manufacturer who use specialized large format Li-Ion cells. The Tesla Roadster (first generation), which was built before Tesla moved into the Fremont facility, also used 18650 cells.

For the Model 3 and Y, Tesla uses larger 2170-type cylindrical lithium-ion battery cells. The larger size was optimized for electric cars, allowing for a higher capacity per cell and a lower number of cells per battery pack. Tesla sources these batteries with an NCA cathode chemistry from Panasonic's production line at Gigafactory Nevada.

=== Body construction ===
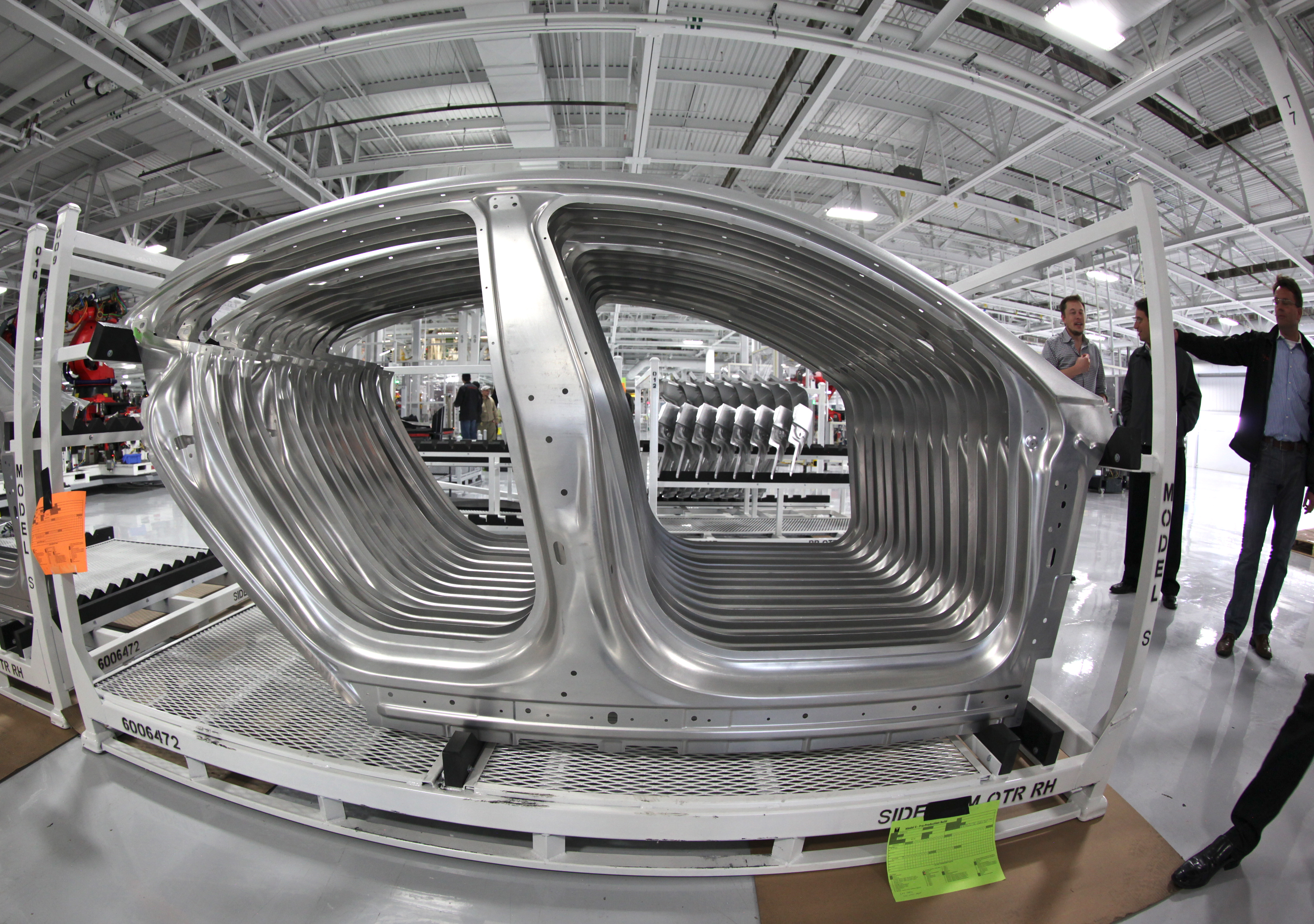
Stacked side panels that have been formed on the tandem press line

Tesla makes extensive use of aluminum in vehicle body production. The Fremont Factory takes delivery of large aluminum coils from suppliers, unwinds them, then flattens and cuts them into sheets in a blanking machine. Additional cutting is also done using a laser cutter.

A robot then transfers the aluminum sheet blanks into the tandem press lines where they are stamped into the various vehicle panels. The Schuler hydraulic stamping press line is the largest in North America and the 6th largest in the world. The presses use up to 11,000 ton-force to form the body panels; the upper section applies 1,400 tons of downward force and the lower section provides 130 tons of force. The blank aluminum sheet is stretched over the lower draw die and openings are cut with robots transferring the panels between processes. In 2020, Tesla added an IDRA Giga Press to the factory, allowing the automaker to stamp out single-piece rear castings for the Model Y.

The workers then inspect each panel to ensure correct pressing. The parts are then stacked in frames and stored. The machines press one part every 6 seconds and create 5,000 parts per day.

=== Final assembly ===
Tesla operates five general assembly lines in Fremont. Two are dedicated to Model S and X production and three are dedicated to Model 3 and Y production. On the assembly line, body panels are welded together. The assembly line moves at a speed of 5 cm/s.

The car is raised and the drive unit is installed into the rear axle assembly. The drive unit provides power directly to the wheels without a drive shaft.

The battery pack weighs almost 1,200 pounds (540 kg) and is delivered to the installation area and is raised into the car using a lift. Placing the battery pack under the cabin floor adds strength and rigidity to the car and lowers the vehicle's center of gravity to 18 inches (46 cm). A titanium plate is installed under the battery pack which protects it in the event of a high-speed collision and to protect from road debris.

== Lawsuits and controversies ==
=== Sexual harassment ===
In 2021, seven women came forward with claims of having faced sexual harassment and discrimination while working at Tesla's Fremont factory. They accused the company of facilitating a culture of rampant sexual harassment. The women said they were consistently subjected to catcalling, unwanted advances, unwanted touching, and discrimination while at work. "I was so tired of the unwanted attention and the males gawking at me I proceeded to create barriers around me just so I could get some relief," one of the complainants Jessica Brooks told The Washington Post. "That was something I felt necessary just so I can do my job." Stories range from intimate groping to being called out to the parking lot for sex.

Women feared calling Human Resources for help as their supervisors were often participants. Musk himself is not indicted, but most of the women pressing charges believe their abuse is connected to the behavior of CEO Elon Musk. They cite his crude remarks about women's bodies, wisecracks about starting Texas Institute of Technology and Science that abbreviated to "T.I.T.S", and his generally dismissive attitude towards reporting sexual harassment. "What we're addressing for each of the lawsuits is just a shocking pattern of rampant harassment that exists at Tesla," said attorney David A. Lowe. In 2017, another woman had accused Tesla of very similar behavior and was subsequently fired. In a statement to the Guardian, Tesla confirmed the company had fired her, saying it had thoroughly investigated the employee's allegations with the help of "a neutral, third-party expert" and concluded her complaints were unmerited.

In May 2022, a California judge ruled that the sexual harassment lawsuit could move to court, rejecting Tesla's request for closed-door arbitration.

=== Labor disputes ===
From 2014 to 2018, Tesla's Fremont Factory had three times as many Occupational Safety and Health Administration (OSHA) violations as the ten largest U.S. auto plants combined. An investigation by the Reveal podcast alleged that Tesla "failed to report some of its serious injuries on legally mandated reports" to downplay the extent of injuries.

In September 2019, a California judge ruled that 12 actions in 2017 and 2018 by Musk and other Tesla executives violated labor laws because they sabotaged employee attempts to unionize.

The California Civil Rights Department filed a suit in 2022 alleging "a pattern of racial harassment and bias" at the Tesla Fremont factory. As of April 2023, the Department is also conducting a probe of the factory based on a 2021 complaint and claims that Tesla has been obstructing the investigation.

=== Environmental violations ===
In 2019, The United States Environmental Protection Agency fined Tesla for hazardous waste violations that occurred in 2017. In June 2019, Tesla began negotiating penalties for 19 environmental violations from the Bay Area Air Quality Management District; the violations took place around Tesla Fremont's paint shop, where there had been at least four fires between 2014 and 2019. Environmental violations and permit deviations at Tesla's Fremont Factory increased from 2018 to 2019 with the production ramp of the Model 3. The EPA found that Tesla allowed hazardous waste to accumulate on site without a permit beyond the allowed 90 days, failed to "promptly clean up flammable paint and or solvent mixtures", left two 55-US-gallon (210 L) containers of hazardous waste open with "no gasket or locking mechanism", and violated air emission standards for three leaky transmission lines that the waste moved through.

=== Racism ===
Tesla has faced numerous complaints regarding workplace harassment and racial discrimination, with one former Tesla worker who attempted to sue the employer describing it as "a hotbed of racist behavior". Approximately 100 former employees have submitted signed statements alleging that Tesla discriminates specifically against African Americans and "allows a racist environment in its factories." According to the state's Department of Fair Employment and Housing, the Fremont factory is a racially segregated place where Black employees claim they are given the most menial and physically demanding work. The accusations of racism culminated in February 2022 with the California Department of Fair Employment and Housing suing Tesla for "discriminating against its Black workers."

In July 2021, former employee Melvin Berry received $1 million in his discrimination case in arbitration against Tesla after he claimed he was referred to by the n-word and forced to work longer hours at the Fremont plant.

In October 2021, a jury verdict in the Owen Diaz vs. Tesla trial awarded the plaintiff $137 million in damages after he had faced racial harassment at Tesla's Fremont facility during 2015–2016. In a blog, Tesla stressed that Diaz was never "really" a Tesla worker, and that most utterings of the n-word were expressed in a friendly manner. In April 2022, federal judge William Orrick upheld the jury finding of Tesla's liability but reduced the total damage to $15 million. Diaz was given a two-week deadline to decide if he would collect the damages. In June 2022, Diaz announced that he would be rejecting the $15 million award, opening the door for a new trial. In April 2023, Diaz was awarded $3.2 million in the new trial.

Few of these cases against Tesla make it to trial as most employees are made to sign arbitration agreements. Employees are afterwards required to resolve such disputes out of court, and behind closed doors.

=== COVID-19 pandemic ===
Tesla's initial response to the COVID-19 pandemic in the United States has been the subject of considerable criticism. Musk had sought to exempt the Tesla Fremont factory in Alameda County, California from the government's stay-at-home orders. In an earnings call in April, he was heard calling the public health orders "fascist". He had also called the public's response to the pandemic "dumb" and had said online that there would be zero cases by April. In May 2020, while Alameda County officials were negotiating with the company to reopen the Fremont Factory on the 18th, Musk defied local government orders by restarting production on the 11th. Tesla also sued Alameda County, questioning the legality of the orders, but backed down after the Fremont Factory was given approval to reopen. In June 2020, Tesla published a detailed plan for bringing employees back to work and keeping them safe, however some employees still expressed concern for their health.

In May 2020, Musk told workers that they could stay home if they felt uncomfortable coming back to work. But in June, Tesla fired an employee who criticized the company for taking inadequate safety measures to protect workers from the coronavirus at the Fremont Factory. Three more employees at Tesla's Fremont Factory claimed they were fired for staying home out of fear of catching COVID-19. This was subsequently denied by Tesla, which even stated that the employees were still on the payroll. COVID-19 cases at the factory grew from 10 in May 2020 to 125 in December 2020, with about 450 total cases in that time period out of the approximately 10,000 workers at the plant (4.5%).

=== Safety incidents ===
In November 2013, there was an accident when the low-pressure aluminum casting press failed, spilling molten metal on three workers and causing their clothing to catch fire. Tesla was fined US$89,000 by the California Division of Occupational Safety and Health for seven safety violations, six considered serious.

== See also ==
- List of Tesla factories
