= Tom Zhu =

Manufacturing industry executive

- 朱晓彤
- Born: Zhu Xiaotong; China
- Education: Auckland University of Technology (BSc); Duke University (MBA)
- Occupation: Senior Vice President of Automotive at Tesla, Inc.
- Years active: 2014–

Zhu Xiaotong (朱晓彤), also known as Tom Zhu, is a manufacturing industry executive. As of April 2023, Zhu is an executive officer at Tesla, Inc. serving as the Senior Vice President of Automotive. In his role, Zhu has oversight of the electric carmaker's assembly plants and sales operations.

Previously, he was the vice president for Greater China and was tasked with bringing Gigafactory Shanghai online. He was reportedly among a group of employees who slept in the factory when the Chinese government imposed a lockdown following a surge of COVID-19 cases in the area.

There are reports that Zhu is being groomed to succeed Elon Musk as CEO of Tesla. Zhu is the highest-profile executive at Tesla after Musk. Zhu's appointment to a global SVP role came at a time when Musk was seen as distracted by his acquisition of Twitter and was urged by investors to appoint more senior executives.

Zhu was born in China but holds a New Zealand passport. He earned a Bachelor of Science degree in commerce in information technology from the Auckland University of Technology and a Master of Business Administration degree from Duke University. After graduating from Duke, Zhu was a project manager at a company established by his classmates, where he advised Chinese contractors working on infrastructure projects in Africa. He joined Tesla in 2014.
