= Tesla Model Y =

Electric compact crossover SUV

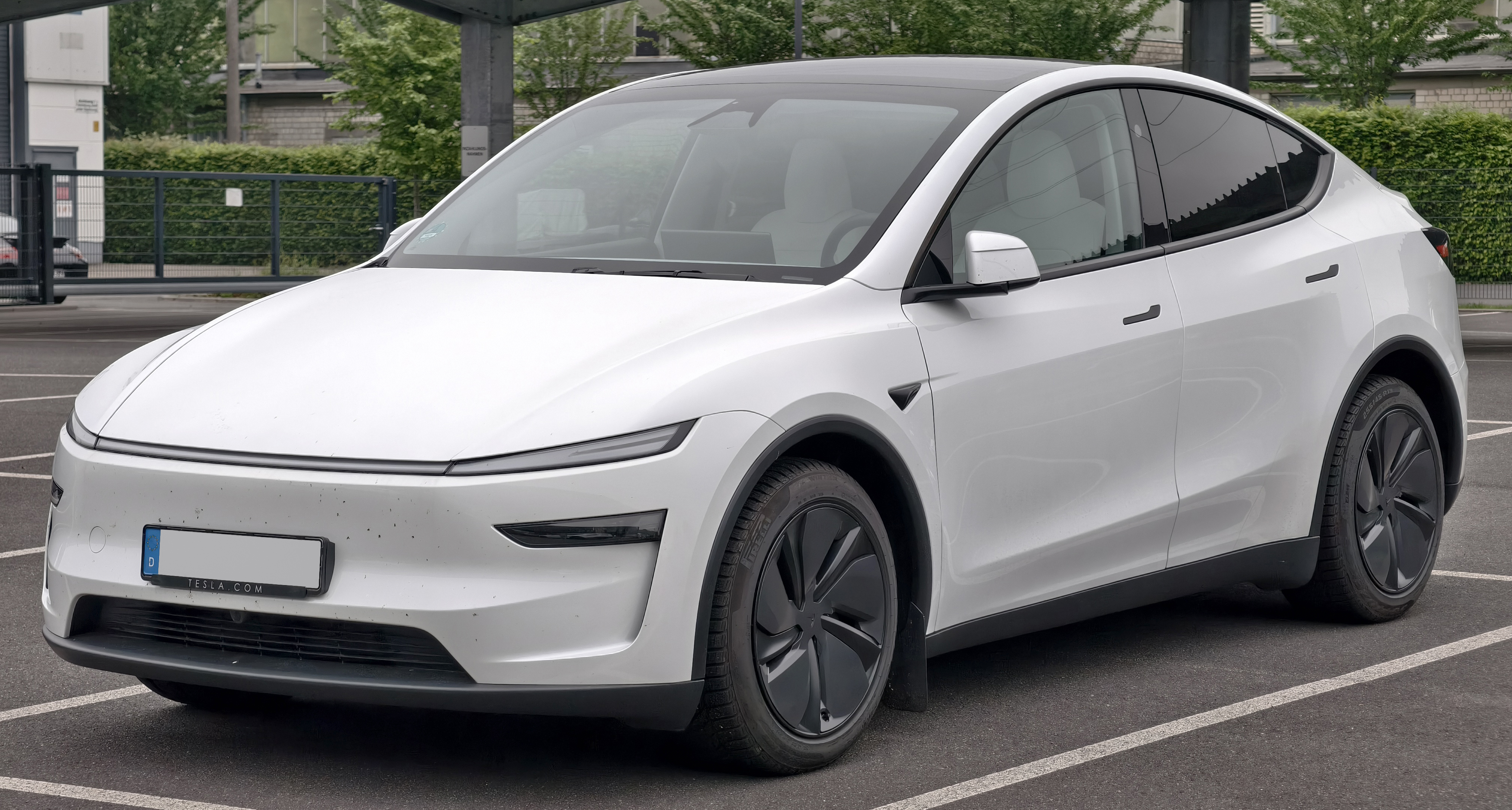
- 2026 Tesla Model Y

Overview
- Manufacturer: Tesla, Inc.
- Production: January 2020 – present
- Assembly: United States: Fremont, California (Fremont Factory); Austin, Texas (Gigafactory Texas); China: Shanghai (Gigafactory Shanghai); Germany: Grünheide (Gigafactory Berlin-Brandenburg)
- Designer: Franz von Holzhausen

Body and chassis
- Class: Compact crossover SUV; Mid-size crossover SUV (Model Y L)
- Body style: 5-door SUV
- Layout: Rear-motor, rear-wheel-drive; Dual-motor, all-wheel-drive
- Related: Tesla Model 3 Tesla Cybercab

Powertrain
- Electric motor: Internal permanent magnet, synchronous reluctance (rear); Induction (front, AWD only)
- Battery: 60–81 kWh lithium-ion (LFP on standard range, Li-NMC on long range/Performance)
- Electric range: 260–310 miles (418–499 km) (EPA)
- Plug-in charging: 11.5 kW (AC); 250 kW (DC; 225 kW on Standard)

Dimensions
- Wheelbase: 113.8 in (2,890 mm); 119.7 in (3,040 mm) (Model Y L)
- Length: 187.0 in (4,751 mm) (2020–2025); 188.6 in (4,790 mm) (2025–present); 195.9 in (4,976 mm) (Model Y L)
- Width: 75.6 in (1,920 mm); 78.0 in (1,982 mm) (Model Y L)
- Height: 63.9 in (1,624 mm); 65.7 in (1,668 mm) (Model Y L)
- Curb weight: 4,154–4,404 lb (1,884–1,998 kg); 4,603 lb (2,088 kg) (Model Y L)

The Tesla Model Y is a battery electric compact crossover SUV produced by Tesla, Inc. since 2020. First presented in March 2019 as the company's fifth production model, the Model Y is the best-selling electric vehicle of all time, having sold more than 2.16 million units worldwide.

After its 2019 introduction, the Model Y started production at the Tesla Fremont Factory in California in January 2020. Production at Giga Shanghai, China was added in December 2020, and at Gigafactory Texas since late 2021. Deliveries from Gigafactory Berlin-Brandenburg, Germany started in March 2022. The Model Y is based on the Model 3 sedan and serves as a larger variant, with around 76 percent of parts being shared between the two and identical exterior and interior styling. While most Model Y are configured with two-row seating, in the US the Model Y offered optional third-row seats for a seven-passenger seating capacity until the 2025 refresh.

In 2023, Tesla delivered 1.2 million Model Ys, making it the world's best-selling vehicle that year, surpassing the Toyota Corolla and becoming the first electric vehicle to claim that title. In 2024 sales were second to the Toyota RAV4. A refreshed version of the Model Y was revealed in January 2025, with upgrades similar to the upgraded Model 3. In mid-2025, Tesla introduced the Model Y L, a long-wheelbase, six-seat variant of the Model Y.

== History ==
=== Pre-launch ===
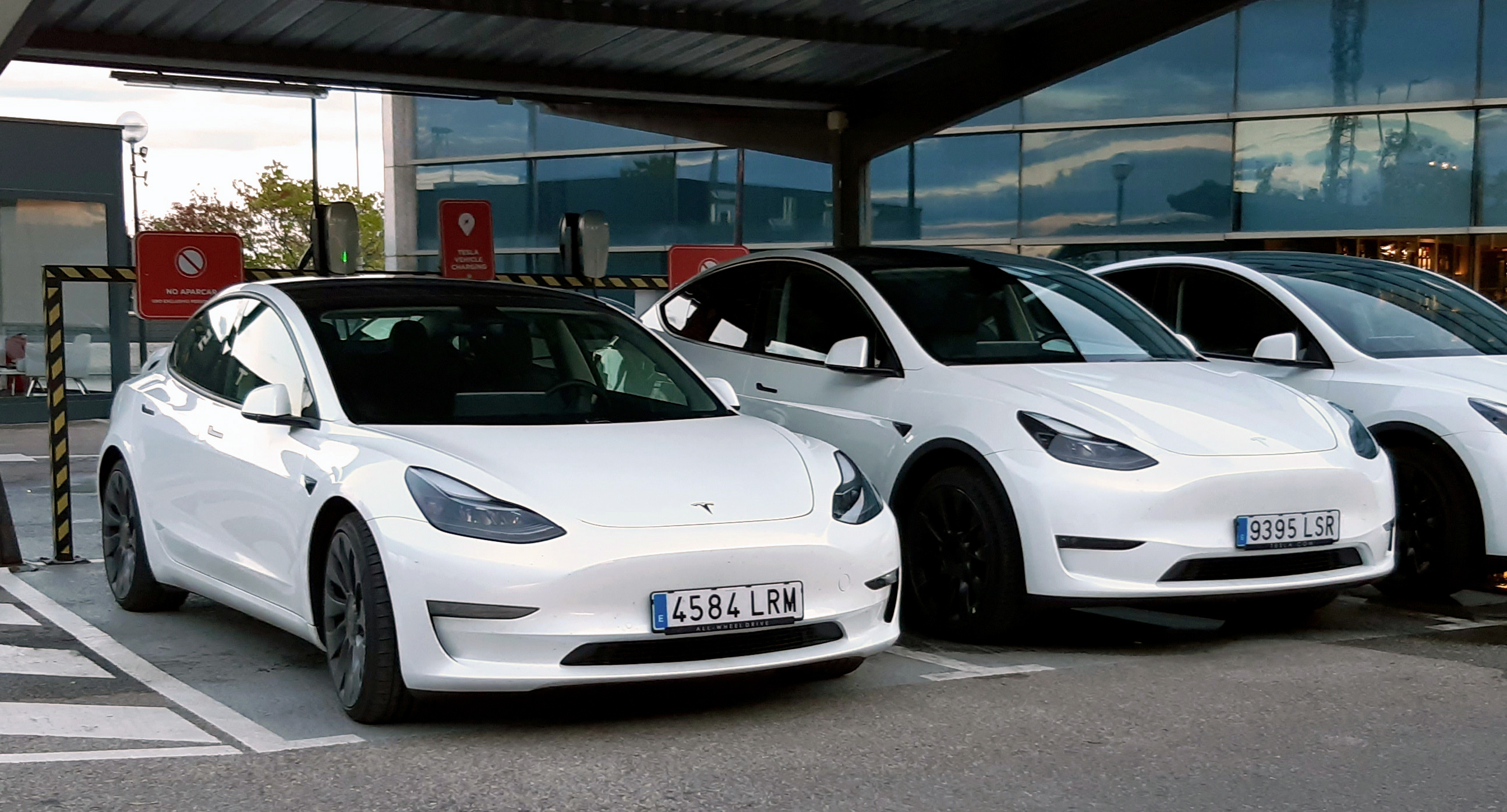
Pre-2024 Tesla Model 3 (left) and Pre-2025 Tesla Model Y (right) side by side

In 2013, Tesla Motors filed a trademark to the name "Model Y". In 2015, CEO Elon Musk hinted on Twitter that either the Model 3 or a future Model Y would have falcon-wing doors. In 2017, a Model Y silhouette was teased to Tesla shareholders at the annual general meeting in June. Musk also announced that the Model Y would be produced in a new factory, as the Fremont plant would not have room to accommodate another production line.

In June 2018, a new silhouette was revealed by Musk. He stated that the Model Y would be formally announced in March 2019. In October 2018, Musk said he had approved the final prototype of the Model Y, though full volume production was not expected until 2020. On March 3, 2019, Elon Musk published multiple tweets, announcing the unveiling event and confirming some specifications. Musk confirmed the vehicle would use standard doors, as opposed to the falcon-wing doors used on the Model X.

=== Production ===
Year	Model 3/Y vehicles delivered
2020	442,511
2021	911,208
2022	1,247,146
2023	1,739,707
2024	1,704,093
2025	1,585,279

At the March 2019 unveiling, the Model Y was expected to be built at Giga Nevada in Sparks, Nevada. By May 2019, Tesla said it was rearranging production lines at the Tesla Factory in Fremont, California to make room for Model Y production instead.

On January 29, 2020, Tesla reported in its Q4 2019 earnings report that Model Y production had already started in the Fremont factory, that one can now place an order for their premium versions with all-wheel drive, and that delivery of Model Y would begin in Q1 2020.

In November 2019, Tesla announced that the Tesla Model Y would be the first vehicle to be assembled at the first European Gigafactory, Giga Berlin. Tesla started deliveries of the Berlin-made Model Y since March 2022, mainly for European markets.

Initial production of the made-in-China Model Y began in mid-December 2020 with 250,000 Model Y expected to be produced in 2021 in China alone. In November 2020, Tesla signed an agreement with LG Chem to supply battery cells for Model Y production in China.

On October 7, 2020, Musk tweeted that Giga Berlin Model Y would get single-piece rear and front frame cast, structural battery pack, and new 4680 battery cells.

Vehicles manufactured from May 2021 no longer include radar for adaptive cruise control, and those from May the same year lack lumbar support on passenger seats.

From October 2022, Tesla began removing ultrasonic sensors from Model Y vehicles for North America, Europe, the Middle East and Taiwan, followed by other markets. As a result, the vehicles now rely solely on cameras to provide driver assistance features.

== Design ==
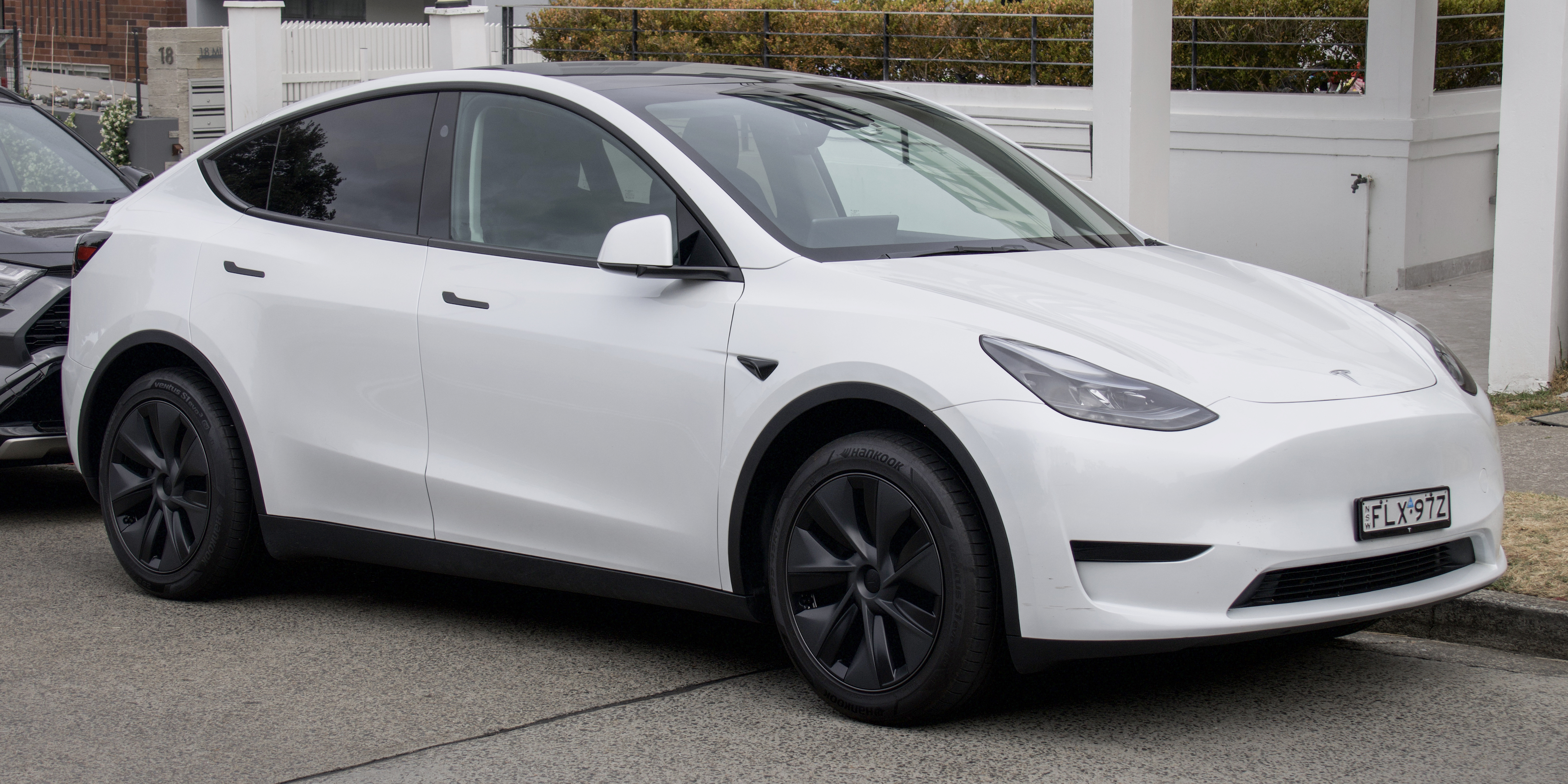
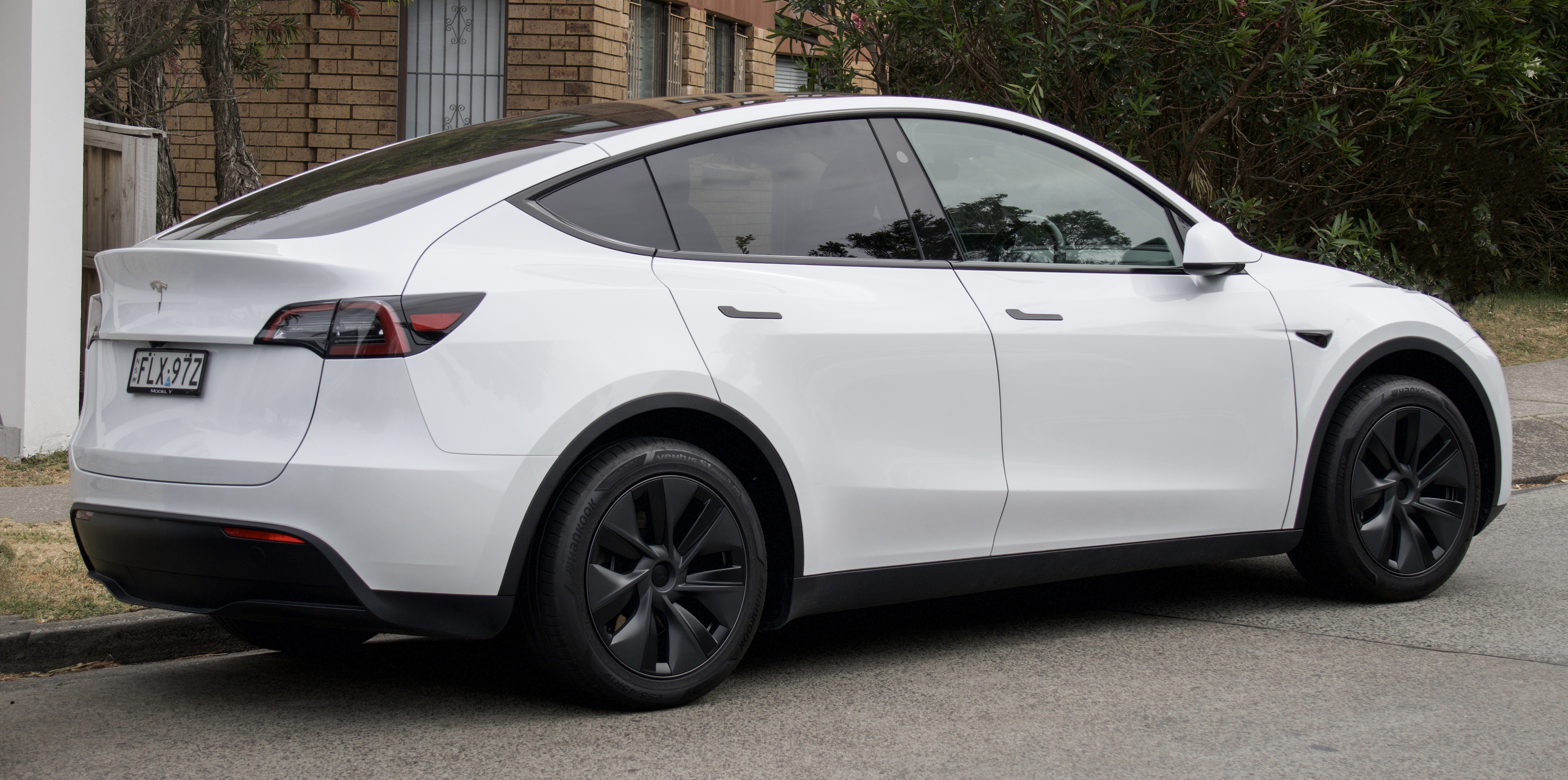
Pre-refresh Model Y RWD
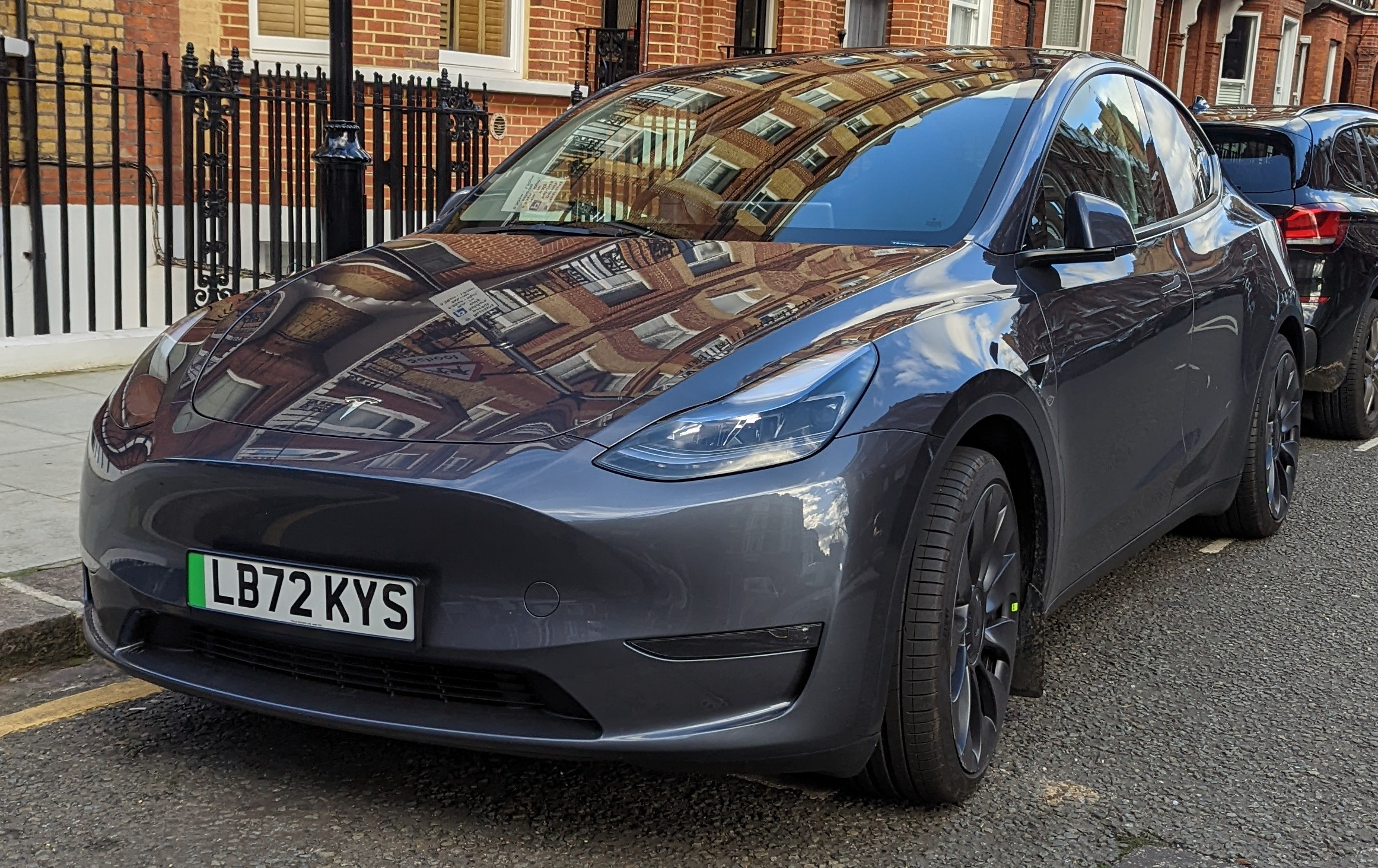
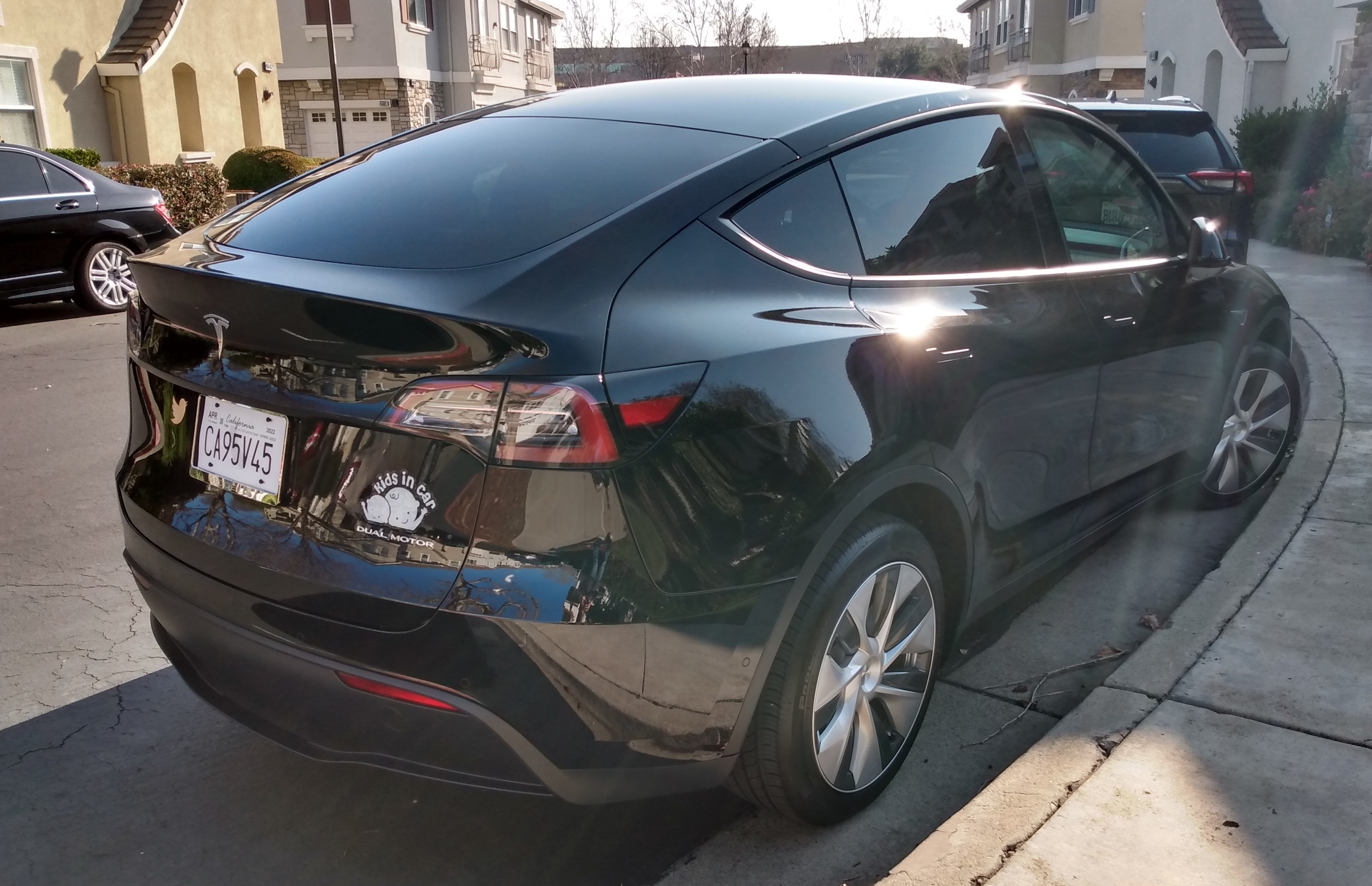
Pre-refresh Model Y Long Range AWD

The Tesla Model Y featured a streamlined crossover design derived from the Model 3 sedan, adopting similar proportions and surface treatment while integrating a higher roofline and hatchback-style tailgate. The overall form emphasized aerodynamics, achieving a drag coefficient of 0.23, with smooth body surfacing and mechanical flush door handles.

At the front, the Model Y retained the brand's grilleless fascia, with narrow LED headlamps and a sculpted bumper forming a continuous curve into the front fenders. The roofline followed a fastback silhouette tapering toward a short rear overhang, visually aligning the Model Y closer to a coupe SUV profile rather than a traditional SUV. The rear design incorporated a full-width tailgate with integrated LED taillights and a discreet lip spoiler on the liftgate edge. A black plastic lower diffuser contrasted the body color was added to reduce perceived height.

The Model Y shares approximately 75% of its components with the Model 3 sedan, enabling streamlined production and reduced manufacturing costs. CEO Elon Musk stated that the high degree of component commonality with the Model 3 facilitates faster production scaling.

== Technical details ==
=== Powertrain and battery ===
The Model Y is offered in rear-wheel-drive (RWD) and dual-motor all-wheel-drive (AWD) configurations. RWD variants use a single rear-mounted internal permanent-magnet synchronous reluctance motor, while AWD variants add a front induction motor, allowing the vehicle to disengage the less-efficient front motor when its output is not needed.

Battery chemistry and capacity vary by market and trim. Standard-range variants use lithium iron phosphate (LFP) cells, while Long Range and Performance variants use nickel-based (NMC) cells, with usable capacities ranging from approximately 60 to 81 kWh. Model Y vehicles have been produced with several cell formats over the vehicle's life, including 2170 cells, prismatic LFP cells in China-built standard-range cars, and structural battery packs using 4680 cells in some Texas-built vehicles. All variants support up to 11.5 kW AC charging and DC fast charging at up to 250 kW (225 kW on the Standard trim) via Tesla's Supercharger network and, in most markets, the Combined Charging System or North American Charging Standard.

=== Heat pump ===
The Model Y is Tesla's first vehicle to use a heat pump instead of electric resistance for interior cabin heating. Electric cars using electric resistance heating can lose 40% or more of their range in ambient temperatures below 20 °F (−7 °C). The heat pump can be up to 300% more efficient than electric resistance heating.

Some electric vehicles from other manufacturers, including the Nissan Leaf, Renault Zoe, BMW i3, Jaguar I-Pace, Audi Q8 e-tron, and Kia Niro, had already implemented heat pumps. Tesla's heat pump has been praised for using far fewer parts.

Tesla's heat pump system includes unique features including the "Super Manifold" and the "Octovalve". Inside the Super Manifold two systems meet: one for water-glycol coolant (used for managing the temperature of the battery, computers and powertrain) and the other for R1234YF refrigerant (used for cabin temperature control). The two systems share a liquid cooled condenser and a chiller. The Octovalve has eight ports that move the coolant around the different systems of the vehicle. The system allows the vehicle to remove waste heat from the vehicle's systems and use it to warm the cabin.

Musk has said that the new heat pump system is one of the two most significant changes in the Model Y over the Model 3 (which included it too in 2021), the other being the new single-piece castings.

=== Radar ===
Beginning with deliveries in May 2021, Tesla built Model Y vehicles for the North American market without radar, relying on cameras and neural-network processing ("Tesla Vision") for Autopilot, Full Self-Driving and certain active safety features. At launch, Autosteer on these vehicles was limited to 75 mph (121 km/h) with a longer minimum following distance; the limit was raised to 85 mph (137 km/h) in May 2022 (software 2022.12.3.7.5).

In February 2022, the National Highway Traffic Safety Administration (NHTSA) opened a preliminary evaluation into reports of unexpected braking ("phantom braking") while using Autopilot, Full Self-Driving or Traffic-Aware Cruise Control in about 416,000 model year 2021–2022 Model 3 and Model Y vehicles. NHTSA closed the investigation on June 29, 2026 without a manufacturer action, citing a "low demonstrated hazard to drivers", no identified crashes, and a decline in reports; it noted that Tesla had released firmware updates in February and March 2022 and that some complaint data aligned with the mid-2021 transition from radar–vision fusion to vision-only. The closure was not a finding that no defect exists.

Software update 2022.20.9, released in August 2022, began transitioning select radar-equipped Model 3 and Model Y vehicles (as well as Model S and Model X) to Tesla Vision. Tesla's release notes state that with Tesla Vision the available following-distance settings are 2–7 and the Autosteer top speed is 85 mph (137 km/h). By comparison, radar-equipped Teslas not running Tesla Vision allowed Autopilot up to 90 mph (140 km/h) and a minimum following distance of one vehicle length rather than two.

=== Single-piece castings ===
In August 2020, it was reported that the Tesla Factory in Fremont would soon activate the world's largest unibody casting machine for Model Y production, switching to casting the rear body in a single piece. Elon Musk told an interviewer that the Berlin-made Model Y is "not just a copy of the Model Y. It's actually a radical redesign of the core technology of building a car". With this new design and production method, rear and front portions of the frame will be a single-cast design. Injecting molten aluminum into a cast and having robots pull out the molded metal allowed Tesla to combine several manufacturing steps. This manufacturing process is expected to result in significant cost savings, reducing a complex structural frame of dozens of parts, requiring many hours of welding to be reduced to just 1 part. Other savings include lower tool investments, reduced production time, lower number of robots, and a smaller production area.

In August 2020, Tesla started assembling the world's biggest casting machine for this purpose, which the company called the Giga Press. The machine was supplied by Italian company Idra.

Production of the Model Y with single-piece rear casting was reported to have started in late December 2020. The new process unified 70 different metal parts into two large parts.

In May 2024, Reuters reported that Tesla had abandoned its plans to adopt the one-piece gigacasting process, due to large upfront investment costs and a larger strategic realignment towards autonomous driving and the Tesla Robotaxi.

== 2025 refresh ==
=== Model Y Premium (originally Long Range) ===
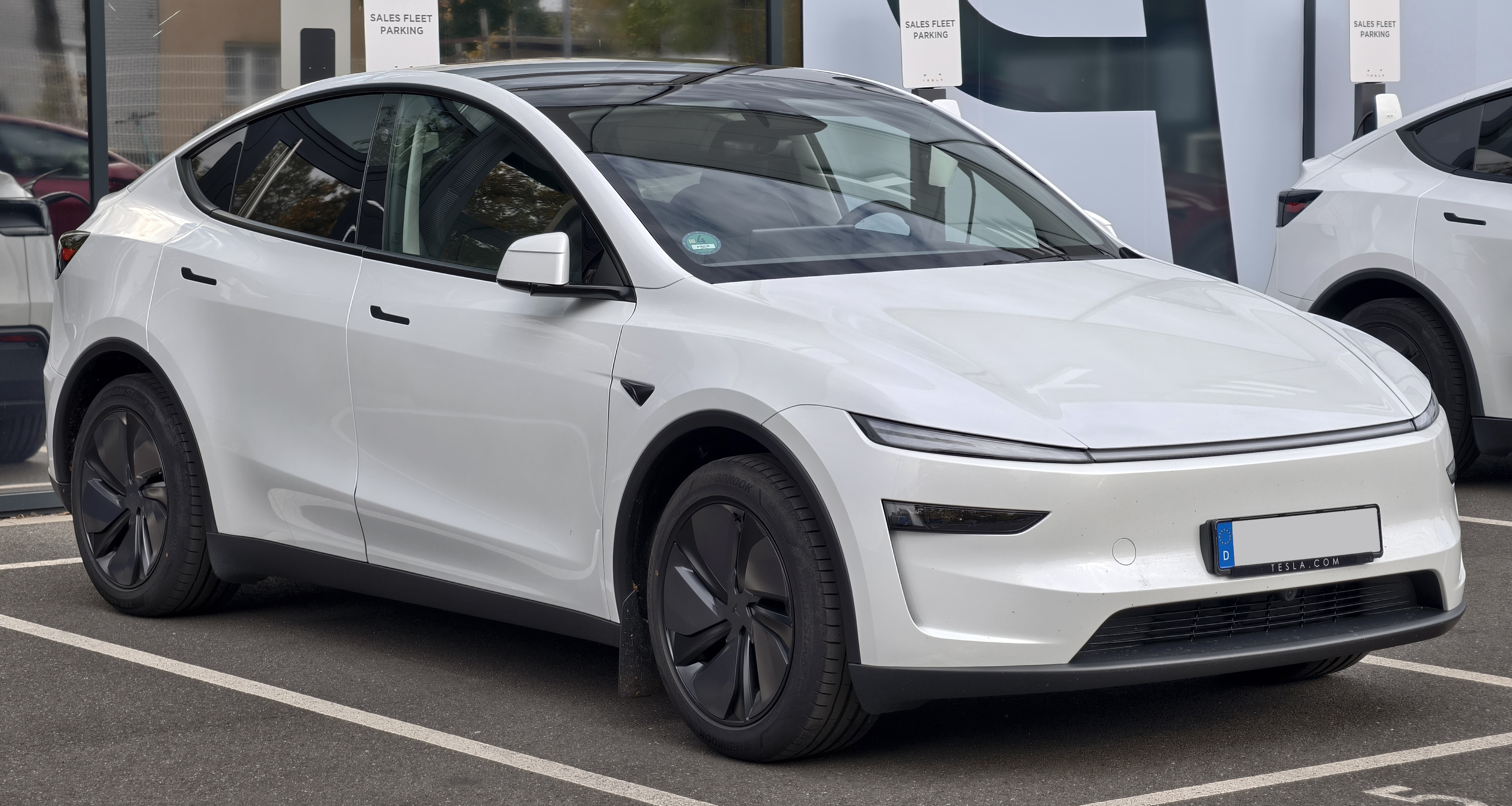
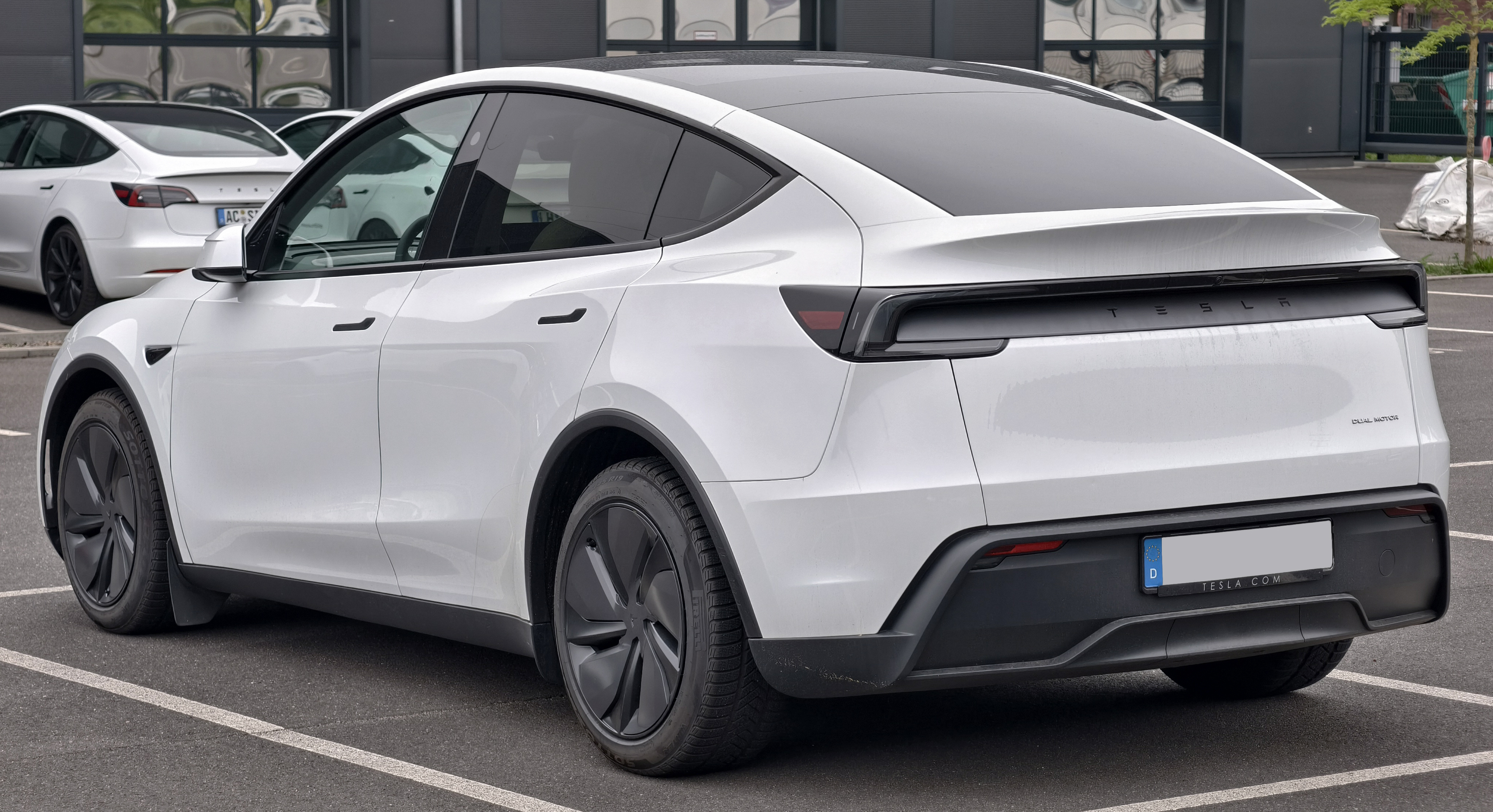
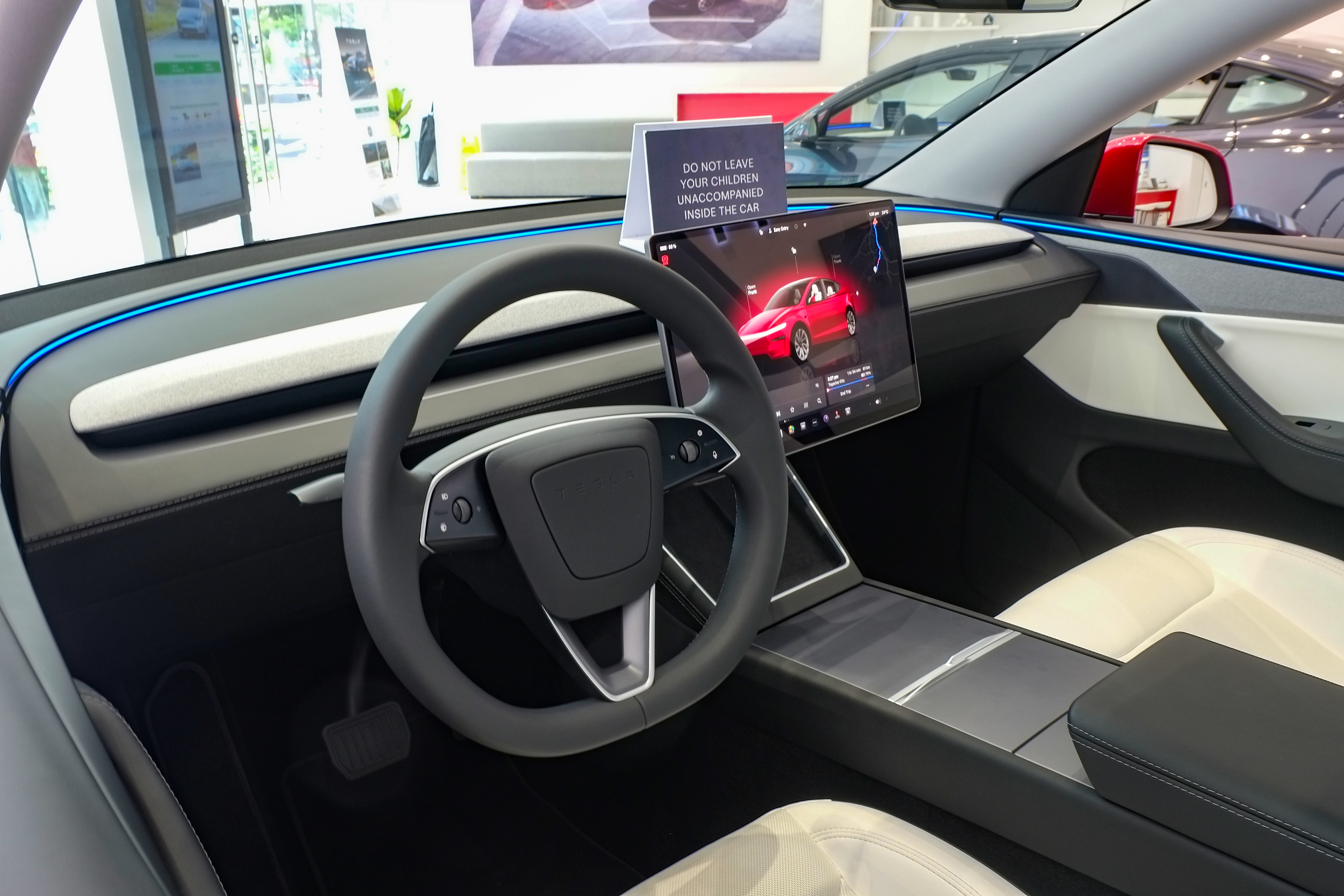
2025 refresh

On January 10, 2025, Tesla launched a refreshed Long Range version of the Model Y. Internally codenamed "Juniper", the new Model Y features a full-width light bar as its daytime running lights and tail light, as well as a touchscreen for passengers in the rear seat. Top speed of the non-performance versions was reduced from 135 to 125 mph (217 to 201 km/h). The long range version also increased the range from 428 to 447 miles (688 to 719 km). As customers of other models complained about the lack of the turn signal stalk, the 2025 Model Y refresh keeps the traditional turn signal stalk.

Changes to the exterior of the new Model Y include a sleeker front design with a more streamlined nose and a thin light bar across the hood. Technical revisions include redesigned wheels and rear diffuser to reduce drag and to "optimise lift balance" between the front and rear wheels for less noise and improved stability at high speeds. The hood no longer includes a "T" badge in most markets for a minimalist aesthetic.

Its cabin adopts design cues from the updated Model 3, including wraparound ambient lighting, a 15.4-inch central touchscreen, ventilated seats, and an 8-inch rear touchscreen for second-row passengers. It also received upgrades such as powered rear seats and improved suspension for a more comfortable ride. Cabin refinement has also been improved with double-layer acoustic glass applied to all windows, while the panoramic glass roof features a silver coating that limits UV and heat transmission into the interior.

A limited-run Launch Series was also introduced to mark the start of production for the refreshed Model Y. This special edition is distinguished by a Launch Series badge on the rear liftgate, a puddle lamp logo, and Launch Series wordmarks applied to the doorsill plates and device charging console. For units specified with the black interior, the cabin also features vegan suede upholstery.

On January 23, 2025, Tesla revealed that its updated Model Y SUV will be available in the U.S., Canada, and Mexico starting in March, with a starting price of approximately US$60,000. This "Launch Series" special edition includes a 320-mile range battery and Tesla's advanced driver-assistance technology, "Full Self-Driving (Supervised)", which is typically a $8,000 upgrade. In comparison, the older Model Y begins at $44,990 with a 337-mile (542 km) range for its rear-wheel drive variant.

In China, deliveries began in February 2025. It was rebranded as the Model Y Premium in North America in October 2025 after the introduction of the Model Y Standard. Models manufactured in June 2026 or later feature vehicle-to-load (V2L) support.

=== Model Y L ===
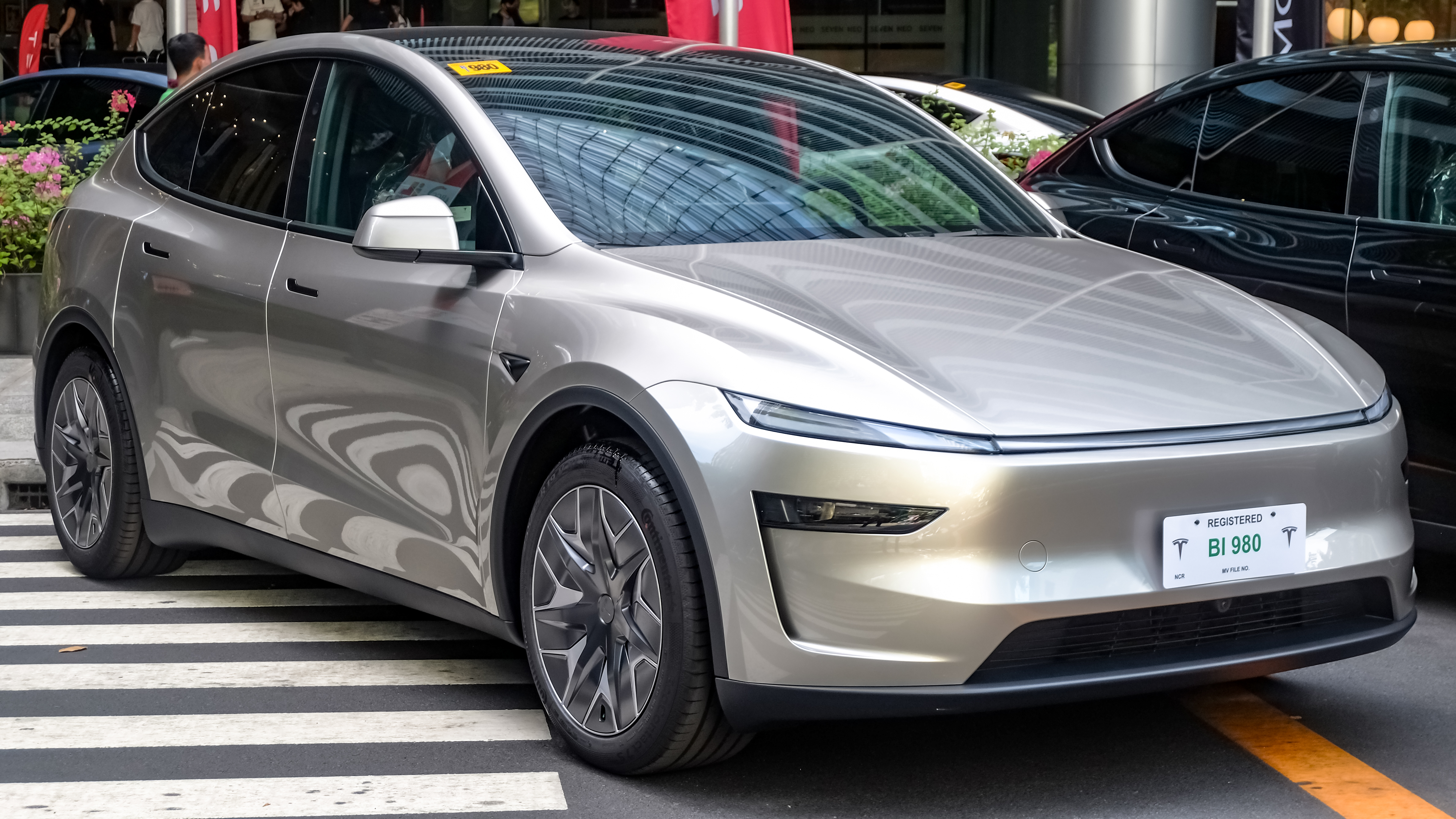
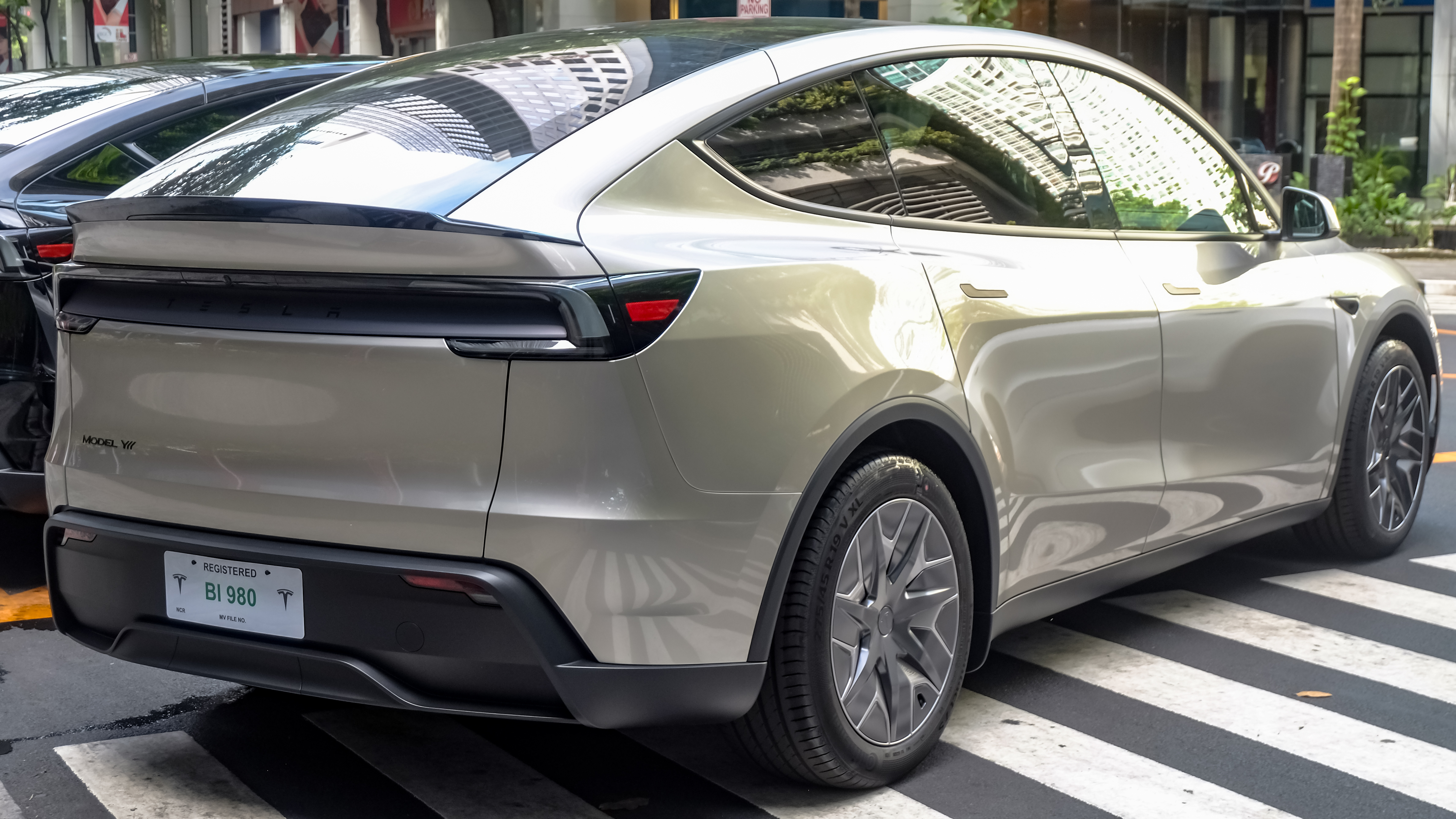
Model Y L

In June 2025, Tesla introduced the three-row, six-seater version of the Model Y, marketed as the Model Y L in China. Debuting in China and produced at Gigafactory Shanghai, the variant introduces a six-seat configuration with a lengthened cabin and upgraded interior features. It is equipped with 19-inch aero wheels in a new design and offers a new exterior color option called Cosmic Silver. Deliveries in China commenced on September 2, 2025.

The Model Y L measures 195.9 in (4,976 mm) in length, 78.0 in (1,982 mm) in width, 65.7 in (1,668 mm) in height, and has a 119.7 in (3,040 mm) wheelbase. Compared with the standard Model Y, it is 7.0 in (179 mm) longer and 1.7 in (44 mm) taller, with most of the added length contributing to a longer wheelbase. The redesigned roofline and rear spoiler result in a drag coefficient of 0.216. The curb weight of the Model Y L is 4,603 pounds (2,088 kg), which is 212 lb (96 kg) more than the dual-motor AWD version of the standard Model Y.

On March 13, 2026, Tesla officially launched the Model Y L in Australia and New Zealand, marking its first release outside of the Chinese domestic market. In these countries, the variant is marketed as the "Premium Long Range AWD", with customer deliveries scheduled to commence in the second quarter of 2026. This model was also launched in the Philippines in March 2026 as the first Southeast Asian country to receive the Model Y L. On July 2, 2026, Tesla launched the Model Y L in the United States.

The Model Y L's cabin adopts a 2-2-2 seating layout, replacing the second-row bench with two captain chairs and adding a 50:50 split-folding third row. The captain chairs feature heating, ventilation, and power reclining functions. Cargo capacity increases to 2,539 litres (89.7 cu ft), compared with 2,130 litres (75 cu ft) for the standard version. The dashboard layout is largely identical to the standard Model Y, with minor revisions such as a larger 16-inch central touchscreen display (previously 15.4 inches). The upgraded wireless charging pad supports simultaneous fast charging up to 50 W and 30 W. The audio system includes 19 speakers, a subwoofer, and two additional overhead speakers. Each seating row is equipped with charging ports, and the front seats gain extendable under-thigh support.

Power is supplied by a dual-motor all-wheel-drive system paired with a nickel cobalt manganese (NCM) lithium-ion battery. While the Chinese domestic variant utilizes an 82 kWh (300 MJ) pack, the Australian and New Zealand models are equipped with a larger 88.2 kWh (318 MJ) (gross) battery, providing a usable capacity of approximately 84 kWh (300 MJ). The front motor produces 142 kW (190 hp), while the rear motor delivers 198 kW (266 hp), resulting in a combined theoretical output of 340 kW (456 hp) and 590 N⋅m (435 lb⋅ft) of torque.

Tesla claims a 0–62 mph (0–100 km/h) acceleration time of 4.5 seconds for the Chinese variant, whereas the Australian and New Zealand specification is rated at 5.0 seconds. The driving range is rated at 467 miles (751 km) on the CLTC cycle for China, while the Australian and New Zealand models are certified for 423 miles (681 km) under the WLTP standard.

=== Model Y Performance ===
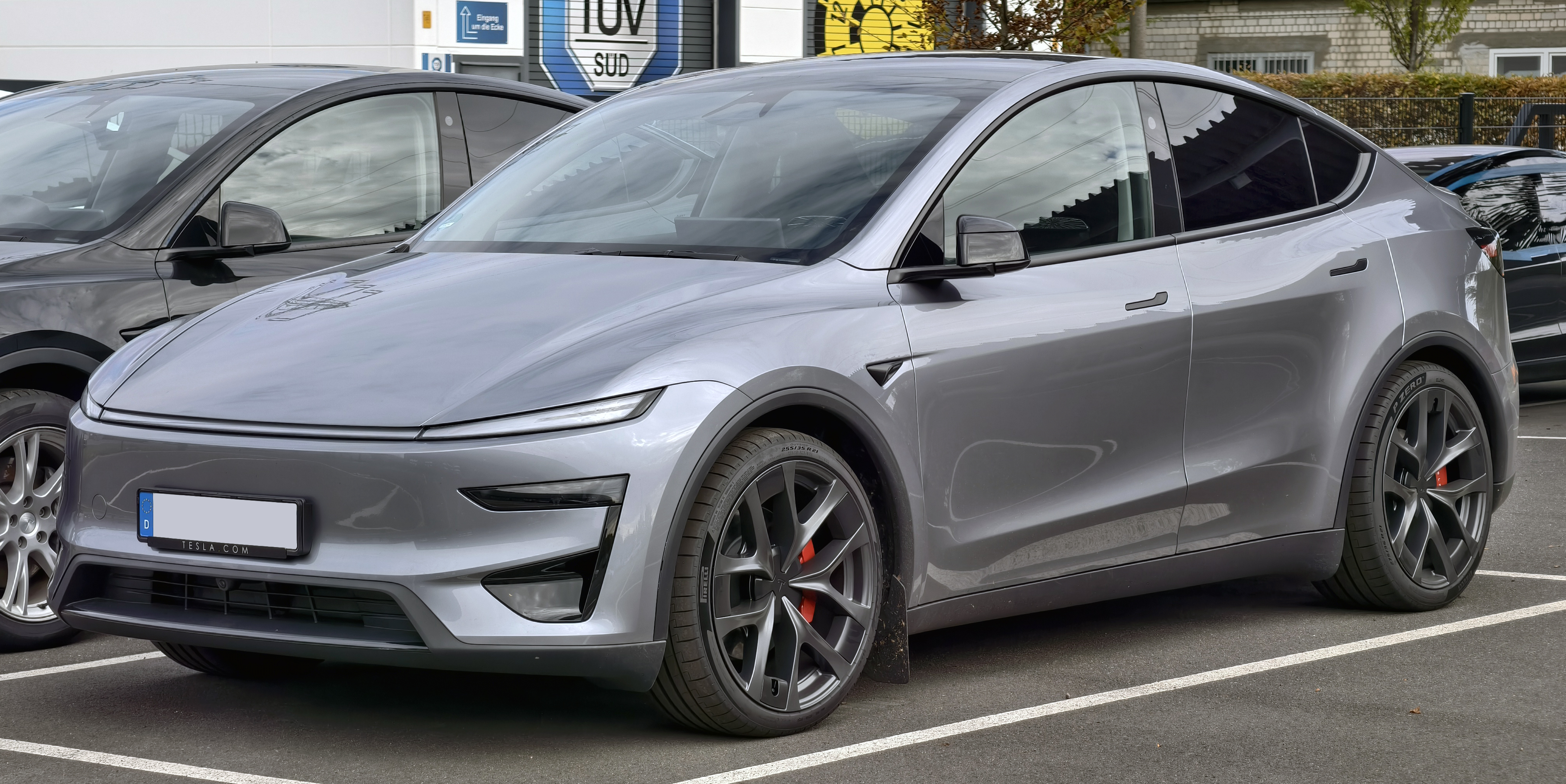
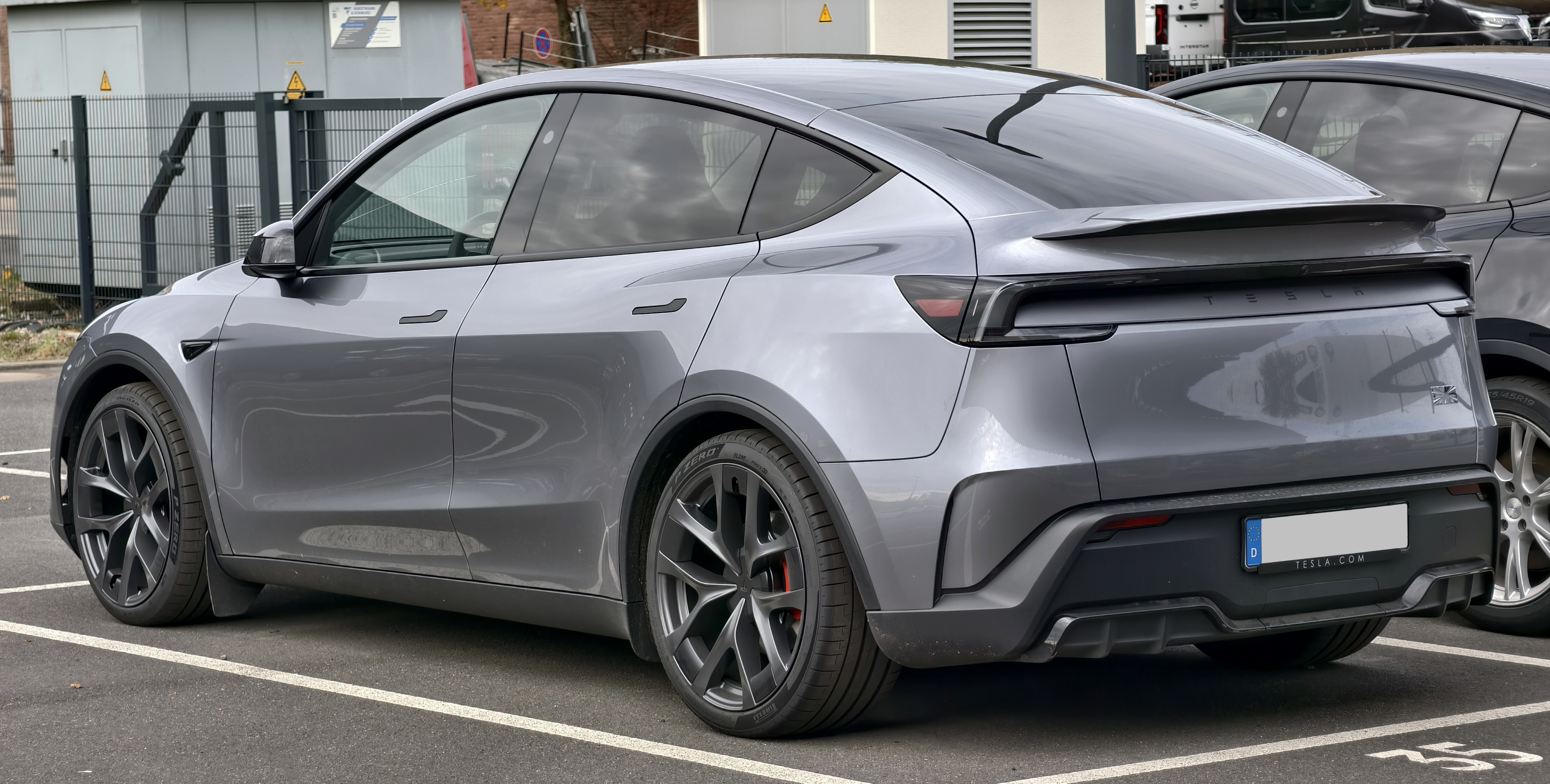
Refresh Model Y Performance

The refreshed Model Y Performance debuted in August 2025, as the top-spec variant of the normal wheelbase Model Y lineup, initially for Europe, the Middle East, and Africa. The North American market model was introduced in October 2025.

The updated Model Y Performance shares several components with the updated Model 3 Performance, while featuring notable upgrades in powertrain and chassis tuning. It gains new front and rear bumpers, a carbon fiber rear spoiler, and other tweaks that together yield 10% less drag and 64% reduced lift, improving front-to-rear balance by 27% over the previous model. Additional exterior highlights include gloss black trim, red brake calipers, 21-inch Arachnid 2.0 forged wheels, and a rear badge with Performance puddle lamps. It has 5.94 inches (151 mm) ground clearance, 0.63 inches (16 mm) lower than the Long Range AWD model. It weighs 4,482 pounds (2,033 kg), which is 79 pounds (36 kg) more than the dual-motor Long Range variant.

The Model Y Performance uses Tesla's Performance 4DU dual-motor system, producing 460 hp (340 kW). It accelerates from 0–62 mph (0–100 km/h) in 3.5 seconds and reaches a top speed of 155 mph (250 km/h). For comparison, the Long Range AWD variant requires 4.8 seconds and tops out at 125 mph (201 km/h). The increased performance comes with a slightly reduced WLTP range of 360 miles (580 km), compared to 373 miles (600 km) on the Long Range AWD.

The updated Performance variant is equipped with a new high-density battery pack, marketed as the 5M battery supplied by LG Energy Solution with around 82 to 84 kWh of usable energy that maintains the same weight as the standard version. It also adopts the adaptive damping system from the Model 3 Performance, combined with revised springs, roll bars, bushings, and a stiffer rear body structure for improved torsional rigidity. It also retains the ability to tow up to 3,500 pounds with its included towing package and class II tow bar.

Drivers are able to select between Standard and Sport settings for the adaptive suspension. Track Mode has been removed, but in its place the stability assist system offers Standard and Reduced modes. The latter reduces traction control interventions but retains essential stability safeguards.

The cabin of the updated Model Y Performance features aluminum pedals, carbon-fiber dashboard and door trims, and Performance-specific front seats with ventilation, heating, and power-adjustable thigh support. The central touchscreen display is enlarged to 16 inches (up from 15.4 inches), matching the unit in the long-wheelbase Model Y L, and offers 80% more pixels than before.

The updated Model Y Performance became the first Model Y to feature vehicle-to-load (V2L) and vehicle-to-home (V2H) bi-directional charging.

=== Model Y (originally Standard) ===
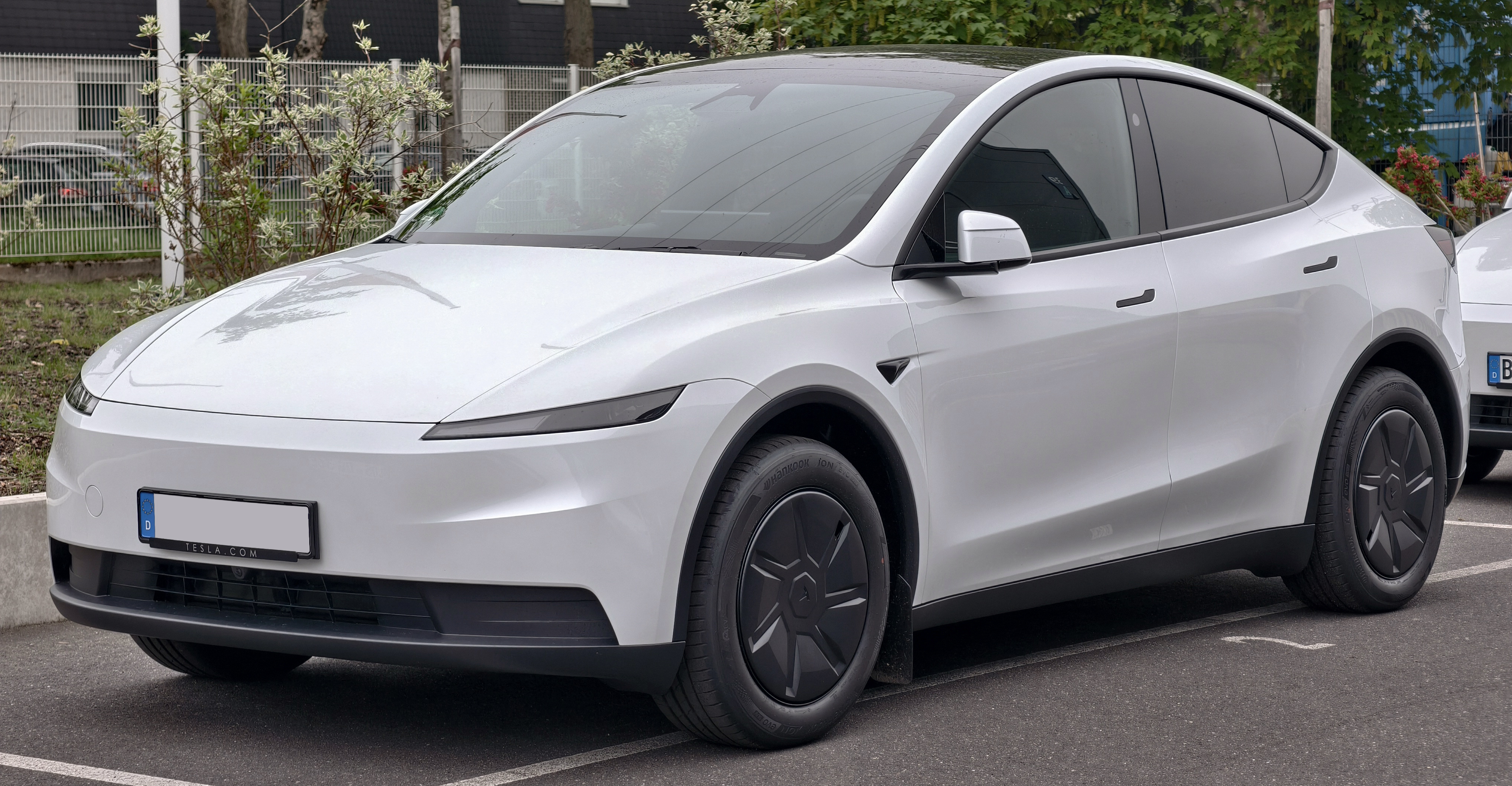
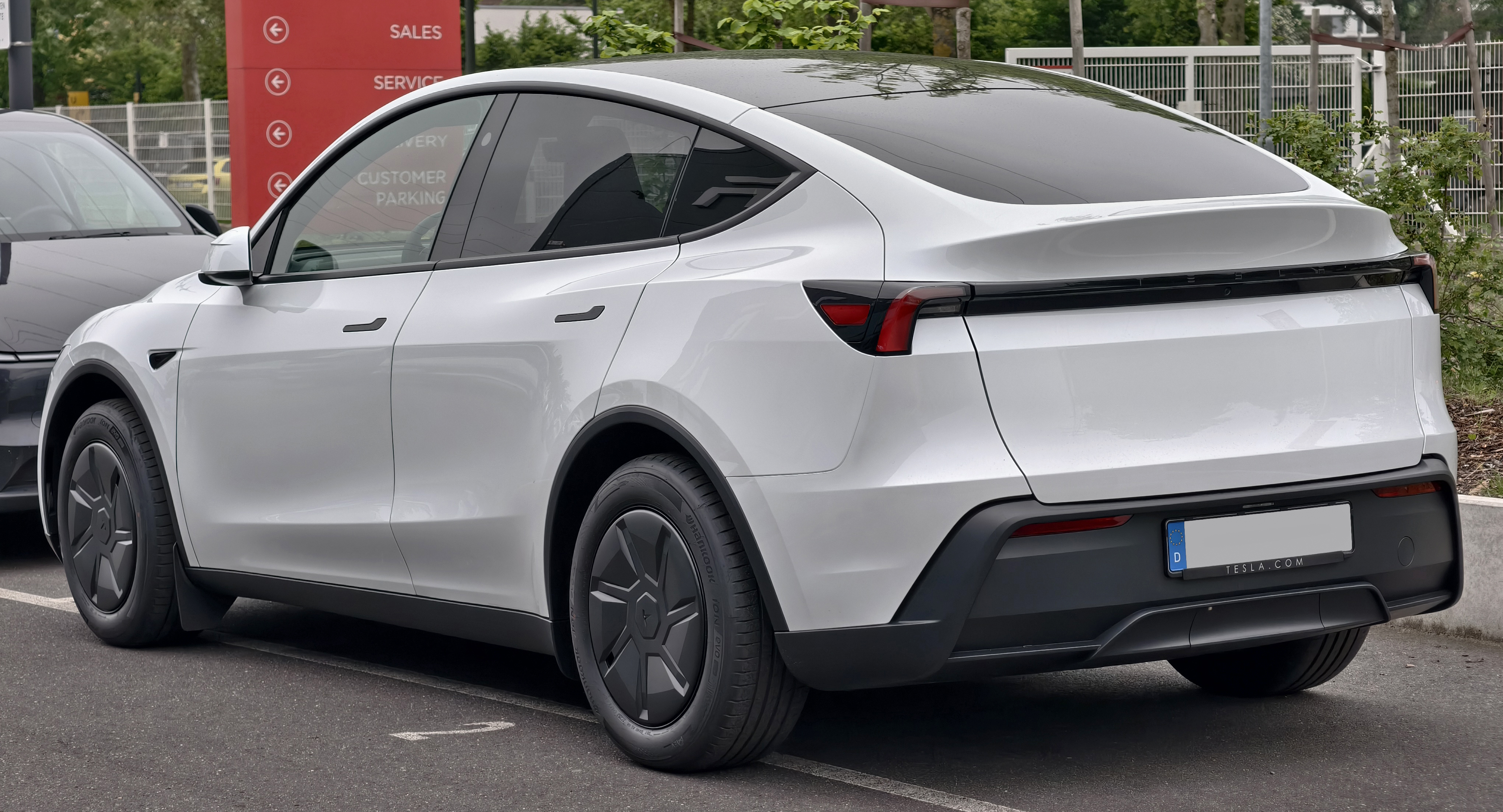
Model Y Standard

In October 2025, Tesla released the cheapest version of the Model Y called the Model Y Standard, initially for the North American market with rear wheel drive only. The existing Long Range trims were rebranded as the "Premium" trims.

Changes and equipment reductions include simplified front end design without the lightbar, smaller 18-inch wheels with simpler designs, simpler taillights without the connecting lightbar piece, half-textile upholstery replacing leather seat, redesigned center console, reduced speaker count from 15 to 7, a smaller frunk without a drain plug and an indirect tire-pressure monitoring system. Removed features include the FM/AM radio, interior ambient lighting, power folding mirrors, front ventilated seats, rear heated seats, power adjustment for rear seats and steering wheel, HEPA filter and the rear seat infotainment screen. Tesla Autopilot is limited to traffic aware cruise control without autosteering. The maximum charging power is reduced to 225 kW from 250 kW on the Performance and Premium trims. The trim also uses passive shock absorbers instead of the frequency-dependent units fitted to other models. Available paint colors are gray, black and white.

Instead of replacing the glass roof with a regular metal roof, Tesla opted for the Standard version to be fitted with a headliner with sound deadener to cover the glass roof.

In North America, the Model Y Standard retails for $5,000 less than the Premium RWD trim. In February 2026, Tesla dropped the "Standard" name from the trim.

== Markets and configurations ==
=== Pricing ===
Tesla's direct-to-consumer sales model allowed it to adjust Model Y prices frequently and without dealer negotiation, producing unusually large and rapid price swings. Through 2021 and 2022, amid strong demand and supply-chain constraints, Tesla raised Model Y prices repeatedly; the Long Range AWD rose to as much as US$65,990 by 2022. In January 2023, following the passage of the Inflation Reduction Act, Tesla cut Model Y prices by as much as US$13,000 to bring variants below the US$55,000 cap required for the federal EV tax credit. The company then raised and cut prices several more times that year; by October 2023 the Model Y was at its lowest price since launch. The cuts pushed down used Model Y values and prices across the broader EV market, with new Model 3 and Model Y prices falling roughly 25% over 2023. The frequent changes drew complaints from recent buyers, including protests by owners in China after sudden cuts devalued newly purchased vehicles.

=== United States ===
During its introduction, there were four planned powertrain configurations for the Model Y in the U.S., which are Standard Range Rear-Wheel Drive (RWD), Long Range RWD, Long Range with Dual Motor All-Wheel Drive (AWD), and Performance (with Dual Motor All-Wheel Drive). However, the Long Range RWD model was not produced until 2024.

Timeline of Tesla Model Y in the U.S.

The Standard Range RWD configuration was initially canceled in July 2020 after being listed as to be announced in "spring 2021", due to the range (230 miles or 370 km) being unacceptably low to CEO Elon Musk. On January 7, 2021, Tesla once again released the Standard Range RWD configuration, alongside the seven-seat option for the Model Y. The Standard Range RWD features 244 miles (393 km) of EPA-estimated range. Tesla stopped taking orders for the variant in February 2021, making it the shortest-lived configuration offered for the Model Y.

After reports emerged in February 2021, on December 6, 2021, Tesla formally notified customers who had pre-ordered the Long Range RWD that their chosen configuration is no longer available in the U.S. According to reports, this configuration was never delivered in the U.S.

On April 9, 2022, Tesla began building the Standard Range AWD configuration. Manufactured at Gigafactory Texas, it was equipped with the new 4680 battery cells and structural battery pack technology rated at 279 miles (449 km) of EPA range. At first, this configuration was only available for employees, invited reservation holders, and customers residing in the Texas area. Around April 7, 2023, Tesla made the configuration for sale to the general public. On September 14, Tesla stopped taking orders for the Standard Range AWD.

On January 12, 2023, Tesla announced a significant price reduction for the Model Y and Model 3. This reduction made the Model Y Long Range eligible for the federal tax credit of $7,500 under the Inflation Reduction Act, which is applicable only for cars that are priced below $55,000.

Tesla reintroduced the Standard Range RWD model to the US market in October 2023. In May 2024, the Standard Range RWD model was no longer offered for sale and was replaced by a Long Range RWD model. It was revealed that the Standard Range RWD model vehicles built in 2023 and early 2024 were the same as the new Long Range RWD model, but with the former having a software lock in place to reduce range to 260 miles. Elon Musk announced on social media that owners of the Standard Range RWD model from 2023 and 2024 may be able to pay a fee to unlock additional range, pending regulatory approval.

=== Canada ===
In April 2023, Tesla began producing made-in-China Model Ys to be sold in Canada. This allowed more US manufactured vehicles that qualified for the US federal tax credit to be sold in the US.

=== Australia ===
Orders for the Model Y in Australia opened on 10 June 2022, with the initial lineup consisting of the Rear-Wheel Drive (RWD) and Performance AWD imported from Gigafactory Shanghai. Deliveries commenced in August 2022. The Long Range AWD configuration was added on April 4, 2023.

On March 13, 2026, Tesla restructured the Australian lineup to focus on "Premium" trim levels and launched the Model Y L, a three-row, six-seat variant. This made Australia the first export market for the extended-wheelbase model outside of China. While the RWD, Long Range, and Y L models continue to be sourced from Shanghai, the Performance AWD was shifted to production at Gigafactory Berlin-Brandenburg in Germany.

The 2026 Model Y Performance was priced at $89,400 (before on-road costs) to remain below the Australian Luxury Car Tax (LCT) threshold for fuel-efficient vehicles, which was set at $91,387 for the 2025–26 financial year. This strategic pricing avoids the 33% tax levy applied to the value above the threshold, bringing the flagship's local cost into closer parity with United States pricing.

=== China ===
On June 5, 2020, Tesla launched the Model Y Online design studio for the Chinese market, allowing customers in China to place orders for the upcoming made-in-China Model Y. First delivery of the model was made on January 18, 2021.

On January 1, 2021, Tesla started selling the Model Y in China, and it sold out its planned production (an unknown quantity) for Q1 2021 within 6 days.

In June 2024, the Jiangsu province government listed the Model Y as being eligible for purchase for government use. It is the first time that a Tesla car entered China's official vehicle procurement catalog.

=== India ===
On July 15, 2025, Tesla launched the Model Y in India. The units are imported from China.

== Specifications ==
Range	Standard				Long			
Powertrain	RWD	RWD	RWD	AWD	RWD	AWD	Model Y L (AWD)	Performance
Battery cell type	2170 (LNMC)	Prismatic (LFP)	2170 (LFP)	4680 (NCMA)	2170 (LNMC)	2170 (LNMC)	2170 (LNMC)	2170 (LNMC)
Battery Capacity		60 kWh	software capped	67.6 kWh		81 kWh	88.2 kWh	81 kWh
Range (EPA)	244 miles (392 km)	244 miles (392 km)	260 miles (418 km)	279 miles (449 km)	357 miles (575 km)	327 miles (526 km)	—	306 miles (492 km)
Range (WLTP)		282 miles (455 km); 267 miles (430 km)			336 miles (541 km)	331 miles (533 km)	423 miles (681 km)	319 miles (514 km)
0 to 60 mph	5.3 sec.	6.9 sec.	6.6 sec.	5.0 sec.	5.4 sec.	4.6 sec.	5.0 sec.	3.3 sec.
Top speed	135 mph (217 km/h)	135 mph (217 km/h)	135 mph (217 km/h)	135 mph (217 km/h)	125 mph (201 km/h)	125 mph (201 km/h)	125 mph (201 km/h)	155 mph (249 km/h)
Power (peak)	280 hp (210 kW)	295 hp (220 kW)				384 hp (286 kW)	507 hp (378 kW)	456 hp (340 kW)
Torque (peak)		310 lb⋅ft (420 N⋅m)				376 lb⋅ft (510 N⋅m)	435 lb⋅ft (590 N⋅m)	497 lb⋅ft (674 N⋅m)
Consumption		15.7 kWh / 100 km				13.8 kWh / 100 km	12.3 kWh / 100 km	15.8 kWh / 100 km
Drag coefficient	0.23				0.23		0.216	0.23
Cargo space	76.2 cu ft (2,158 L)				76.2 cu ft (2,158 L)		89.7 cu ft (2,539 L)	76.2 cu ft (2,158 L)
Curb weight	3,920 lb (1,780 kg)	4,209 lb (1,909 kg)	4,154 lb (1,884 kg)	4,363 lb (1,979 kg)		4,416 lb (2,003 kg)	4,603 lb (2,088 kg)	4,416 lb (2,003 kg)

== Recalls ==
- In July 2024, 2020–2024 Tesla Model Y, 2017–2024 Tesla Model 3, 2016–2024 Tesla Model X and 2013–2024 Tesla Model S were recalled for issues with open hood latch detection while in driving state.
- In January 2025, Tesla recalled some 2024–2025 Model 3 and Model S vehicles and some 2023–2025 Model X and Model Y vehicles for a software update to avoid shorting the car computer, preventing (among other things) the rear view camera from displaying. Software releases 2024.44.25.3, 2024.44.25.6, or later contain changes to the power-up sequence. Computers that were damaged had to be replaced under warranty to complete the remedy.
- In February 2025, more than 370,000 potentially affected vehicles (both Model 3 and Model Y) were recalled to address possible loss of power to electronic power-assisted steering.
- 48 Model 3 and Model Y vehicles produced between April 3, 2025, and May 7, 2025, were recalled due to improperly torqued seat fasteners.
- In July 2025, 5 Tesla vehicles of the 2026 Model Y, manufactured between March 27, 2025, and July 10, 2025, were recalled for an improperly secured horn ground wire, potentially rendering the horn inoperable.
- In August 2025, the Australian federal government recalled 7301 vehicles manufactured in the 2025 range over a software flaw that could result in the window closing on body parts.
- In August 2026, Tesla began recalling vehicles in China to replace electrically operated door handles following safety concerns over emergency access to the vehicles.

== Safety ==
=== Ratings ===
NHTSA 2022
Overall	5/5 stars
Frontal, driver	5/5 stars
Frontal, passenger	5/5 stars
Side, driver	5/5 stars
Side, passenger	5/5 stars
Side pole, driver	5/5 stars
Rollover	/ 9.70%

US IIHS Tesla Model Y:
Category	Rating
Small overlap frontal offset (Driver)	Good
Small overlap frontal offset (Passenger)	Good
Moderate overlap frontal offset	Good
Side impact (original test)	Good
Roof strength	Good
Head restraints and seats	Good
Headlights	Good / Acceptable (depending on trim/options)
Front crash prevention (Vehicle-to-Vehicle)	Superior
Front crash prevention (Vehicle-to-Pedestrian, day)	Superior
Child seat anchors (LATCH) ease of use	Acceptable

Euro NCAP test results Tesla Model Y (2022)
Test	Points	%
Overall:	5 /5 stars	
Adult occupant:	36.9	97%
Child occupant:	43.0	87%
Pedestrian:	44.8	82%
Safety assist:	15.7	98%

Euro NCAP test results Tesla Model Y (2025)
Test	Points	%
Overall:	5 /5 stars	
Adult occupant:	36.5	91%
Child occupant:	46.0	93%
Pedestrian:	54.4	86%
Safety assist:	16.6	92%

ANCAP test results Tesla Model Y (2022, aligned with Euro NCAP)
Test	Points	%
Overall:	5 /5 stars	
Adult occupant:	36.87	97%
Child occupant:	43.62	89%
Pedestrian:	44.81	82%
Safety assist:	15.75	98%

ANCAP test results Tesla Model Y (2025, aligned with Euro NCAP)
Test	Points	%
Overall:	5 /5 stars	
Adult occupant:	36.52	91%
Child occupant:	46.62	95%
Pedestrian:	54.38	86%
Safety assist:	16.65	92%

ANCAP test results Tesla Model Y L (six seat, three row) (2025, aligned with Euro NCAP)
Test	Points	%
Overall:	5 /5 stars	
Adult occupant:	36.52	91%
Child occupant:	41.40	84%
Pedestrian:	54.38	86%
Safety assist:	16.65	92%

TNCAP (1.0) test result Tesla Model Y RWD (2024, similar to Euro NCAP 2017)
Test	Points	%
Overall:	5/5 stars	
Adult occupant:	37.239	97%
Child occupant:	44	89%
Pedestrian:	32.918	78%
Safety assist:	9.5	79%

=== Concerns and investigations ===
==== Door handles and emergency egress ====
The Model Y uses electronic door releases as the primary means of opening its doors from inside the cabin. In the event of a power loss, collision, or system malfunction, occupants who are unfamiliar with the mechanical backup release may be unable to exit the vehicle. The front-door manual release is positioned near the window switches, while the rear-door release is more concealed; not all Model Y vehicles are fitted with a rear manual release at all. Several incidents have been reported in which parents were unable to reopen a door to reach a child in the back seat, in some cases requiring a window to be broken to regain entry.

In September 2025, the National Highway Traffic Safety Administration (NHTSA) opened a preliminary evaluation covering approximately 174,000 model-year 2021 Model Y vehicles, after receiving nine reports of parents being unable to reopen doors, including four cases in which a window was broken to regain entry. NHTSA's initial review suggested the failures occurred when the electronic locks received insufficient voltage, though owners reported no prior low-voltage warning. In December 2025, NHTSA opened a defect petition review covering about 179,000 model-year 2022 Model 3 vehicles, after a petition alleging that the mechanical release was difficult to locate in an emergency. In early 2026, China announced it would ban fully concealed door handles on new vehicles from 2027, partly in response to the design popularized by Tesla.

==== Phantom braking and radar removal ====
From May 2021, Tesla began producing the Model Y (and Model 3) without radar, relying solely on cameras for its driver-assistance features, a system marketed as Tesla Vision. In February 2022, NHTSA opened an investigation into "phantom braking", in which vehicles using adaptive cruise control or Autopilot decelerate suddenly without an obstacle present. The probe covered an estimated 416,000 model-year 2021 and 2022 Model 3 and Model Y vehicles, following hundreds of owner complaints; NHTSA reported no associated crashes or injuries at the time. NHTSA closed the investigation on 29 June 2026 without a manufacturer action, citing "a low demonstrated hazard to drivers", while noting that the closure "does not constitute a finding by NHTSA that a safety-related defect does not exist". Model Y vehicles produced from October 2022 also omit ultrasonic parking sensors, leaving the cars reliant on cameras alone for proximity-based assistance features.

== Reception ==
The Model Y has generally been well received by automotive critics, who have praised its acceleration, interior space, range, and efficiency, while criticizing its firm ride, handling, and styling. Car and Driver and Top Gear both described it as a capable and practical vehicle despite reservations about comfort and design, with Top Gear calling it a "great car to live with". Reviewers consistently noted that, although the Model Y led its segment commercially, competition was intensifying as more rival electric crossovers reached the market. In February 2024, Consumer Reports named the Model Y to its "10 Top Picks of 2024" list, the only electric vehicle to be included.

The Model Y was the world's best-selling vehicle in 2023, the first electric vehicle to hold that title, before falling to second behind the Toyota RAV4 in 2024. From 2024, however, Tesla's sales came under sustained pressure. The company recorded its first-ever annual decline in global deliveries in 2024, and combined Model 3/Y deliveries fell again in 2025 to about 1.59 million units. Analysts attributed the decline to brand damage associated with CEO Elon Musk's political activities and his association with Donald Trump and European far-right parties, an aging lineup ahead of the 2025 refresh, intensifying competition from Chinese manufacturers such as BYD, and the expiry of US EV tax credits. A 2025 National Bureau of Economic Research working paper by Yale University economists estimated that the "Musk partisan effect" cost Tesla between 1 and 1.26 million US sales from October 2022 to April 2025. Brand-valuation firm Brand Finance estimated that Tesla's brand value fell about 36% in 2025, its third consecutive annual decline. In 2025, BYD surpassed Tesla as the world's largest seller of battery electric vehicles.

== Awards ==
- 2023: Autovista Group Residual Value Award, Compact and Large BEV SUV category.
- 2024: Auto Trader New Car of the Year.
- 2024: Insurance Institute for Highway Safety Top Safety Pick+.
- 2024: Carbuyer Best Company Car; Parkers Best Company Car; BabyCenter Best Family EV.

== Sales ==
Year	U.S. (estimate)	China			Europe					Turkey	Australia	New Zealand	Thailand	Taiwan	Worldwide total
Year	U.S. (estimate)	Model Y	Model Y L	Total	U.K.	Germany	Sweden	Norway	Overall	Turkey	Australia	New Zealand	Thailand	Taiwan	Worldwide total
2021	172,700		—	129,353											410,517
2022	231,400		—	315,314	35,551		6,550	17,356	137,608		8,717	4,226	228	3,644	759,579
2023	385,900		—	456,394	35,899	45,618	16,416	23,085	254,822	12,150	28,769	3,936	5,881	9,697	1,211,601
2024	405,900		—	480,309	32,862	29,896	18,293	16,858	209,214	11,534	21,253	826	881	8,634	1,200,000
2025	317,800	382,245	43,273	425,518	24,298					31,509	22,239		3,460	13,384	

== See also ==
- List of production battery electric vehicles
