= Texas Institute of Technology and Science =

Proposed university in Texas

- Type: Proposal
- Established: December 13, 2023
- Founder: Elon Musk
- Location: Austin, Texas, United States

The Texas Institute of Technology and Science (TITS) is a proposal by Elon Musk to open a university in Austin, Texas.

== Background ==
Musk's personal views include frequent criticism of the American education system. In 2014, he founded Astra Nova School (then Ad Astra School) after pulling his five children out of school because he disapproved of the curriculum, and how it was presented.

Avatar of Elon Musk

Elon Musk
(@elonmusk)
tweeted:

Am thinking of starting new university: Texas Institute of Technology & Science

Oct 29, 2021

In October 2021, Musk tweeted that he would start a new university named Texas Institute of Technology and Science, which corresponds to the humorous acronym TITS. Musk added, "it will have epic merch, universally admired". The name, specifically the acronym, was criticized as sexist. Afterwards, Cher Scarlett, a software engineer and one of the leaders of the #AppleToo anti-harassment group at Apple, described Musk of contributing to a systemic problem in which women in technology companies are being sexualized by male colleagues, originating from executives at the top influencing the company culture downwards.

== Initial funding ==
In December 2023, tax records revealed that Musk had donated $100 million to a new foundation, "The Foundation", set up to create a primary and secondary school focused on teaching science, technology, engineering, and math (STEM) subjects. The foundation included plans to expand the project to the university level accredited by the Southern Association of Colleges and Schools. In 2022, Musk allocated Tesla, Inc. stock valued at $2.2 billion to The Foundation, as reported by Bloomberg.

According to the report, the university intends to be tuition-free but may consider offering need-based scholarships in the future. The university is expected to receive funding primarily through donations.
