= Gigafactory Shanghai =

Tesla, Inc. factory

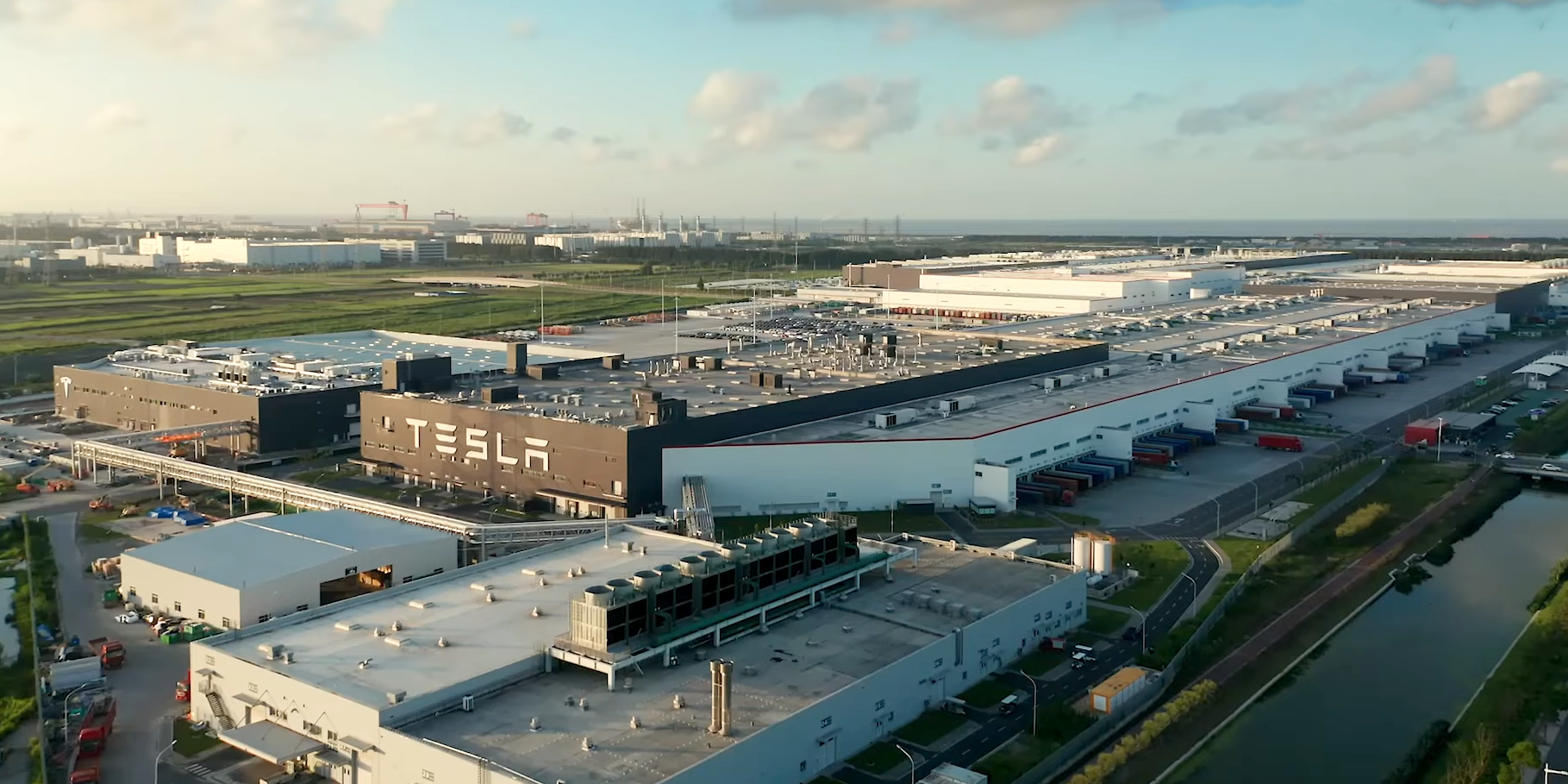
- Gigafactory Shanghai in May 2024
- Built: 2018–2019
- Operated: October 2019
- Location: D203A, Tonghui Road No. 168, Nanhui New Town, Pudong New Area; Shanghai, China
- Coordinates: 30°52′13″N 121°46′08″E
- Industry: Automotive
- Products: Model 3; Model Y
- Employees: 20,000 (June 2023)
- Area: 0.865 km^{2} (0.334 sq mi; 214 acres)
- Owner: Tesla, Inc.

Gigafactory Shanghai (Chinese: 特斯拉上海超级工厂; lit. 'Tesla Shanghai Super Factory') (also known as Giga Shanghai, or Gigafactory 3) is an automobile manufacturing plant in Shanghai, China, operated by Tesla, Inc. Construction of the plant began in January 2019, initial production started in October, and the first production vehicles rolled out of the factory in December 2019, less than one year after groundbreaking. The main plant currently manufactures the Model 3 and Model Y. As of July 2023, Tesla says the factory has the capacity to build over 750,000 vehicles per year and is the primary production site for Tesla vehicles exported to regions without a Gigafactory.

Unique among foreign automakers in China, the plant is wholly owned by Tesla and not operated as a joint venture with a Chinese company, the first time the government had allowed such an arrangement. While Tesla owns the factory, it does not own the land it is built on, as is typical in China. Tesla has land use rights with an initial term of 50 years.

== History ==
=== Background and land purchase (2018) ===
Tesla Shanghai Co., Ltd., a subsidiary of the electric automaker, was formally established 8 May 2018. In July 2018 Tesla CEO Elon Musk signed an agreement with the Shanghai regional government to build its third Gigafactory, and the first in China. In part due to the good relationship Musk had built with the government, it was permitted to be structured as a wholly owned subsidiary of Tesla and not operated as a joint venture with a Chinese company, the first time the government had allowed such an arrangement for a foreign automaker.

While Tesla owns the factory, it does not own the land it is built on, as is typical in China. The government granted Tesla land use rights with an initial term of 50 years. To finance the plant, Tesla received US$521 million in loans from Chinese banks at favorable interest rates, and US$82 million in grant funding. The local Shanghai government granted Tesla a corporate income tax rate of 15% for 2019 through 2023, compared to the typical 25% rate in China. Having a factory in China also allows the company to avoid tariffs on vehicles imported from the U.S.

In exchange for the land grant and government support, Tesla was required to spend CN¥10.85 billion in capital expenditures per mu (per 666.7 m^{2} or 7,200 sq ft) by the end of 2023, equating to a total minimum investment of CN¥14 billion (US$2 billion). The factory is also required to generate CN¥2.23 billion of annual tax revenues starting at the end of 2023.

On 8 August 2018, compulsory purchase order Shanghai [2018] No. 090 was issued by Pudong New Area Planning and Land Administration, with a closing date for objections of 14 August 2018, and finalization scheduled to occur on 20 August 2018. On 26 September 2018, the bidding process for the newly acquired plots Q01-05 in the area designated as 04PD-0303 were advertised, with the restriction that the land be used for electric car manufacturing, with a minimum investment requirement.

The bidding process ran between 17‒26 October 2018, with the proviso that if there was only one bidder meeting the requirements by 11:30 on 17 October 2018, then the process could be closed and finalized early. Tesla won the long-term lease for 86 hectares (210 acres) of land in Lingang, Shanghai on 17 October. Tesla (Shanghai) was the only bidder, with its bid of 973 million Chinese yuan for the 50-year lease covering the 864,885-square-metre (86.5-hectare) site, with the capital coming from local Chinese banks. The Shanghai Land Transfer contract No. 14 with Tesla (Shanghai) required construction work to begin within 6 months, and be completed within 30 months, with production started after 36 months, and full minimum tax revenues being paid after 60 months. The Land Transfer was scheduled to occur on 12 December 2018, and limits the maximum size of above-ground buildings to 1,729,770 square metres (18,620,000 sq ft) in area [sic] with a maximum height of 30 metres (100 ft). Up to 60,541 square metres (650,000 sq ft) of the area can be used for non-production office buildings. Phase 1 of the project will manufacture Tesla Model 3 and Tesla Model Y cars, with a target production rate of 250,000 electric cars per year. Tesla stated that it planned to eventually be able to produce 500,000 electric vehicles per year at the site.

The public environmental impact consultation for Phase 1 of the project was opened on 24 October 2018, and scheduled to run for ten working days. Capital expenditures covering the land purchase and initial design costs for Gigafactory 3 were scheduled to occur in the fourth quarter of 2018. The purchase was aided by a loan from Chinese banks, and converted to a $1.4 billion loan in late 2019, also by Chinese banks.

=== Construction and delivery (2019) ===
Groundbreaking ceremony of phase 1, January 2019

A construction permit was granted by the Shanghai municipal government authorizing work to begin after 29 December 2018. The project contractor is China Construction Third Engineering Bureau Co., Ltd., part of China State Construction Engineering, a large state-owned construction company.

The factory site is in the Lingang Industrial Zone within the Pudong district of Shanghai, with the western edge bordering the Fengxian district.

By December 2018, construction activity at the site was underway with site grading. Shanghai Mayor Ying Yong visited the site on 5 December. A subsidiary of China Minmetals was making preparations for piling foundations. Shanghai Construction Group was one of the companies bidding for part of the larger construction contract.

On 7 January 2019, the groundbreaking ceremony was held. By March, foundation work in some areas of the large facility was in place and structure is being erected, with crews operating at the site on multiple shifts to accelerate construction.

By early August 2019, the building exteriors were nearly complete, and the general assembly building was being fitted with manufacturing equipment, with a target to begin production in November. The plant received its "comprehensive acceptance certificate" on 19 August.

In the 3Q2019 quarterly investor call on 23 October 2019, Tesla reported that it is ahead of schedule with getting the factory into production. Moreover, it was built in just ten months, is ready for production, and was built for approximately 65% less capital expenditure per unit of manufacturing capacity than had been the Model 3 production system in the US. General assembly of the initial Tesla Model 3s was operating by October 2019, with 30% of the car coming from China.

=== Expansion (2021) ===
In April 2021, local reports have noted that preliminary work on the new site south of the main complex has been going on for some time. Tesla was the sole bidder for the land, and while the bidding process Gigafactory produced vehicles and the Model Y at a rate of about 450,000 cars per year, the expanded site is already being prepared for construction.

Expansion of Giga Shanghai was briefly halted in 2023 after the Chinese central government expressed concerns with Elon Musk's activities at SpaceX, in particular the quickly expanding military applications of Starlink and its potential impact on global strategic defense.

== Production ==
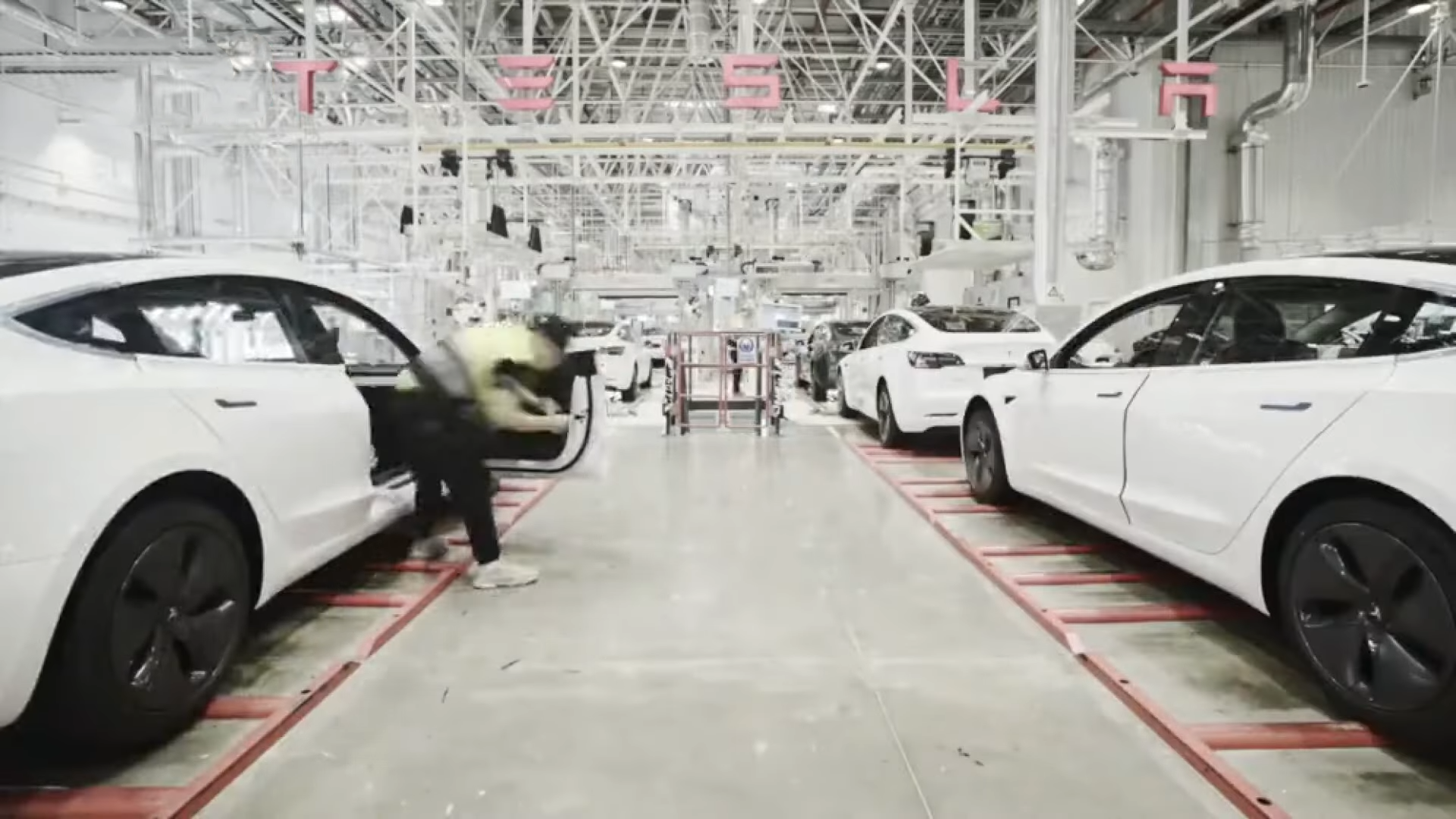
Assembly line of Gigafactory Shanghai, producing the Tesla Model 3

Giga Shanghai currently does final assembly of Model 3 vehicles which began in December 2019, with expectation to begin Model Y final assembly later in 2020. While initially, assembly is accomplished with parts and subassemblies that are shipped into the factory from the US, a major push during 2020 will be to gradually increase the "Made in China" (MIC) content in the car as Tesla China manufacturing matures. As of March 2020, MIC Model Y production is slated for January 2021. Production line capacity of Giga Shanghai is aimed at 5,000 cars per week, and if achieved and sustained could result in an annual capacity of more than 250,000 vehicles. Once the factory has been fully built out and production has fully ramped, Tesla plans for the factory to reach an annual production capacity of about 500,000 vehicles for Chinese consumers.

Transport truck trailer rigs moved cars out by early December 2019, and the first 15 cars from the new factory were delivered on 30 December 2019, to Tesla employees. The first cars to be produced at the Gigafactory and delivered to Chinese customers were delivered on 7 January 2020. Production rate was approximately 1,000 cars per week in early 2020, made by a single shift of workers with a total production line capacity of 2,000 cars per week when Saturday overtime is included.

The Gigafactory Shanghai was temporarily shut down for approximately two weeks by order of the government on 29 January 2020, due to the COVID-19 pandemic. Production resumed 10 February, as did for suppliers and other companies around the country. Several precautions were taken to prevent virus spread, so preliminary plans indicate Tesla could add a second shift of production by the beginning of Q2 2020 which would increase line capacity to approximately 3,500 vehicles per week. By the end of the year, it reached 8,000 vehicles per week, and some of them were found to be right hand drive for export purpose to Australia and New Zealand. In November 2021, total production was 56,965 vehicles and capacity was estimated to be nearing 700,000 vehicles per year, becoming the largest of the Tesla factories. On 28 March 2022, Gigafactory Shanghai was again shut down, this time for 22 days due to a government lockdown in response to the 2022 Shanghai COVID-19 outbreak. It officially reopened on 19 April 2022, initially operating only one shift, with 8,000 workers sleeping at the factory, but resumed normal production near the end of May.

On 12 January 2022, the China Association of Automobile Manufacturers (CAAM) announced that 310,000 new energy vehicles (NEVs) were exported from China in 2021, and that half of the total were assembled in Giga Shanghai. These produced cars are mainly sold to regions such as Europe and Asia and 10 more countries around the world. The main export destination for Chinese-made NEVs was Europe. The China Association of Automobile Manufactures Data showed that the most popular option is Tesla's Model 3.

Tesla announced on 8 December 2025 that 4,000,000 vehicles had been built at Giga Shanghai.

== See also ==
- List of Tesla factories
