= Brightfield =

Brightfield may refer to:

- Bright-field microscopy
- Solar array built on a solar landfill or brownfield, e.g.
  - Brockton Brightfield
