= Tesla Megapack =

Large-scale battery energy storage product manufactured by Tesla Energy

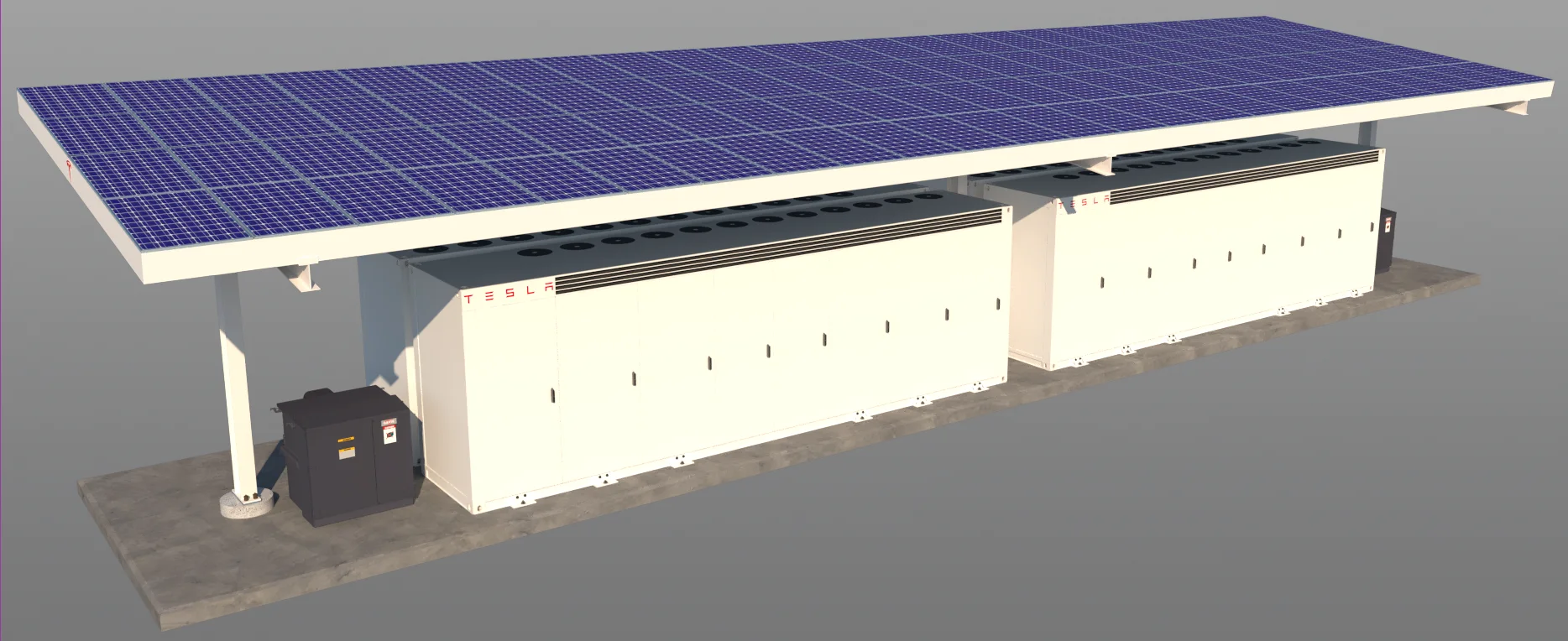
- Tesla Megapack set of 4 with solar canopy 3D sketch
- Type: Grid energy storage
- Inception: June 2019; 7 years ago
- Manufacturer: Tesla Energy
- Website: tesla.com/megapack

The Tesla Megapack is a large-scale rechargeable lithium-ion battery stationary energy storage product, intended for use at battery storage power stations, manufactured by Tesla Energy, the energy subsidiary of Tesla, Inc.

Launched in 2019, a Megapack can store up to 3.9 megawatt-hours (MWh) of electricity. Each Megapack is a container of similar size to an intermodal container. They are designed to be deployed by electric utilities. The energy stored can be used as required, for example during periods of peak electricity demand or when grid power is disrupted.

Tesla Energy also offers the Powerwall, a smaller energy storage device intended for home use.

== History ==
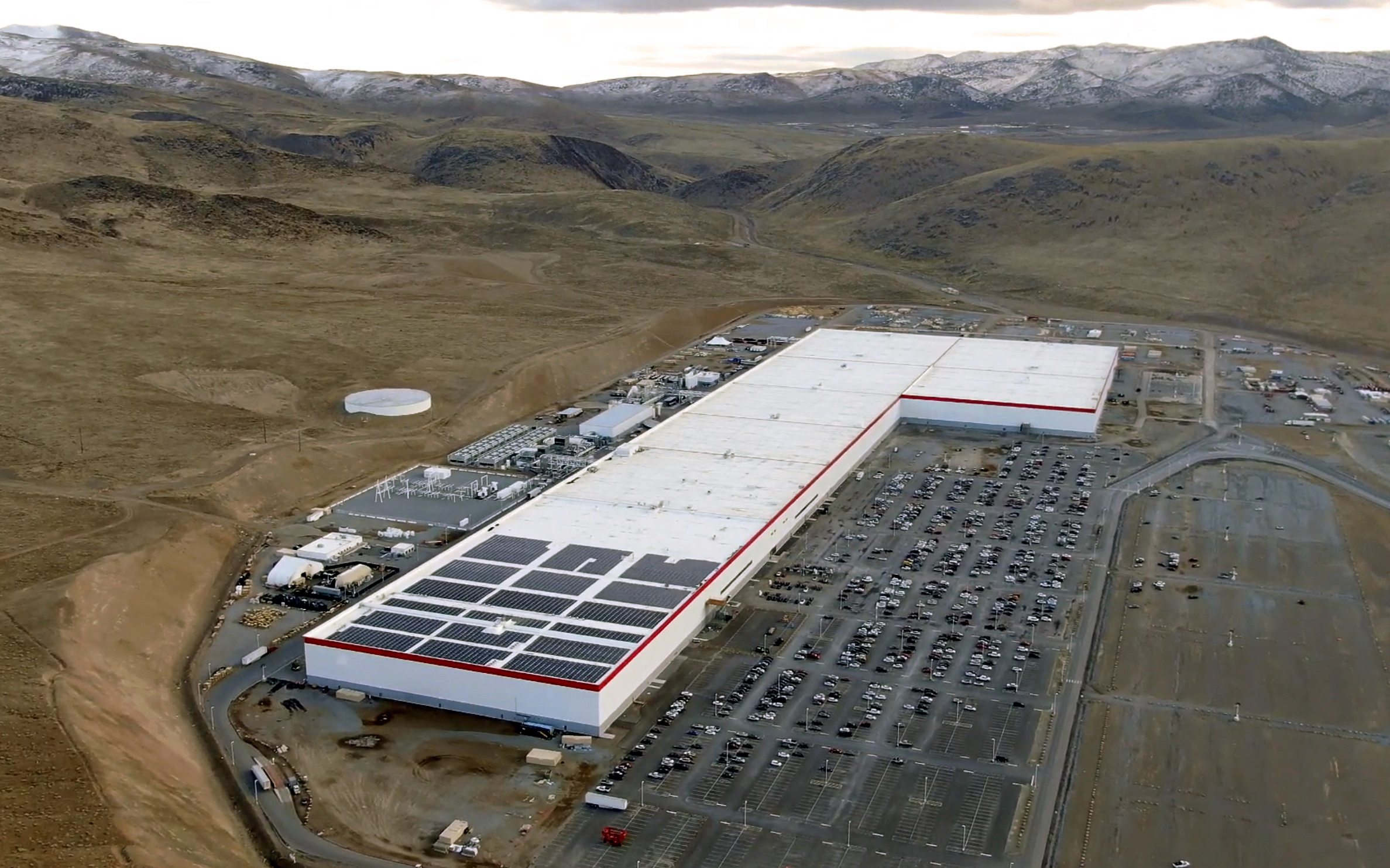
Tesla Giga Nevada, where the Megapack was designed and is manufactured, along with Lathrop

On April 30, 2015, Tesla announced that it would sell standalone battery storage products to consumers and utilities. Tesla CEO Elon Musk stated that the company's battery storage products could be used to improve the reliability of intermittent renewable energy sources, such as solar and wind.

Prior to the Megapack launch, Tesla used its 200 kilowatt-hour (kWh) Powerpack energy storage product to meet the needs of utilities with large-scale storage requirements such as at the Hornsdale Power Reserve.

Design work began on the Megapack project at Giga Nevada at least as early as the first half of 2018.

In July 2019, Megapack launched. It was described by Tesla as a utility-scale energy storage product, suitable for power stations and utilities. Tesla claimed that Megapacks would be compatible with Tesla power station monitoring and energy control software, Powerhub and Autobidder. The company stated that Megapack was designed to meet the needs of large-scale battery storage projects, as with the Powerpacks.

Tesla acquired a former JCPenney distribution center in Lathrop, California, in 2021 and converted it into a battery plant called Megafactory, with a target capacity of 40 GWh/year when finished. Next-generation Megapacks use prismatic (rectangular) lithium iron phosphate (LFP) battery cells, for example in the 585 MWh Kapolei, Hawaii facility from 2024. Tesla's LFP cell suppliers include China's CATL and LG Energy Solution which has factories in South Korea and the US.

Tesla's energy deployment added 3.9 GWh in the first quarter of 2023. The combined delivery of storage (Powerwall and Megapack) was 6.5 GWh in 2022, 14.7 GWh in 2023, and 31.4 GWh in 2024.

In 2023, Tesla announced a new "Megafactory" in Shanghai to manufacture Megapacks, with the goal of producing about 10,000 packs per year, and the factory started low rate initial production in late 2024.

Tesla builds a service facility at the 877 MWh Collie battery in Western Australia, to repair and remanufacture batteries in the state.

On September 8 2025, the company announced a new product for late 2026, called "Megablock", which consists in up to 4 Megapacks version 3 connected with a transformer and a switchgear. Each Megapack 3 is 5 MWh (and 39 tonnes), so each Megablock is 20 MWh. They will be produced in Tesla new facility in Houston, Texas, using LG cells.

== Specifications ==
Model	Unit Cost	Capacity	Power	Round Trip Efficiency	Dimensions (W x H x D)	Cycle Life	Weight
Megapack	$1.24M	2.6 MWh	1 MW		23.52 ft × 8.27 ft × 5.44 ft (7.168 m × 2.522 m × 1.659 m)		56,000 lb (25,400 kg)
Megapack 2	$1.47M	3.854 MWh	1.284 MW	92.0%	23.79 ft × 8.22 ft × 5.37 ft (7.25 m × 2.506 m × 1.637 m)		67,200 lb (30,500 kg)
Megapack 2 XL	$1.39M	3.916 MWh	1.927 MW	85-90%	28.87 ft × 9.14 ft × 5.41 ft (8.8 m × 2.785 m × 1.65 m)	3,000-5000 cycles Tesla.com	84,000 lb (38,100 kg)
Megablock 3/ Megapack 3	estimated on Megapack pricing around $1.39M. 40% lower installation costs with 78% fewer connections.	5 MWh	tbc	91%	tbc	>10,000 cycles	86,000 lb (39,000 kg)

== Terms ==
Each Megapack comes with a 15-year "no defect" and "energy retention" warranty. A 10 or 20 year "performance guarantee" is available for an additional cost. Once a Megapack has reached the end of its useful life, Tesla says they can be returned for recycling.

Megapacks are pre-assembled, including "battery modules, bi-directional inverters, a thermal management system, an AC main breaker and controls."

Tesla requires customers to purchase a maintenance service agreement. Each Megapack receives a minor annual service, and a major service every ten years. The annual maintenance includes inspections and cleaning. The ten-year maintenance includes activities such as replacing the pump and fan for the thermal management system and refilling the coolant fluid. Maintenance is expected to take about an hour per Megapack.

== Design ==
The Megapack thermal management system is located at the top of each unit. It uses coolant fluid, made of an equal-parts mixture of ethylene glycol and water, to keep the battery at operating temperature.

Each Megapack 2XL weighs approximately 84,000 pounds (38,000 kg) and the enclosure is built to a similar size as an intermodal container and includes twistlock fittings to allow automated handling.

== Applications ==
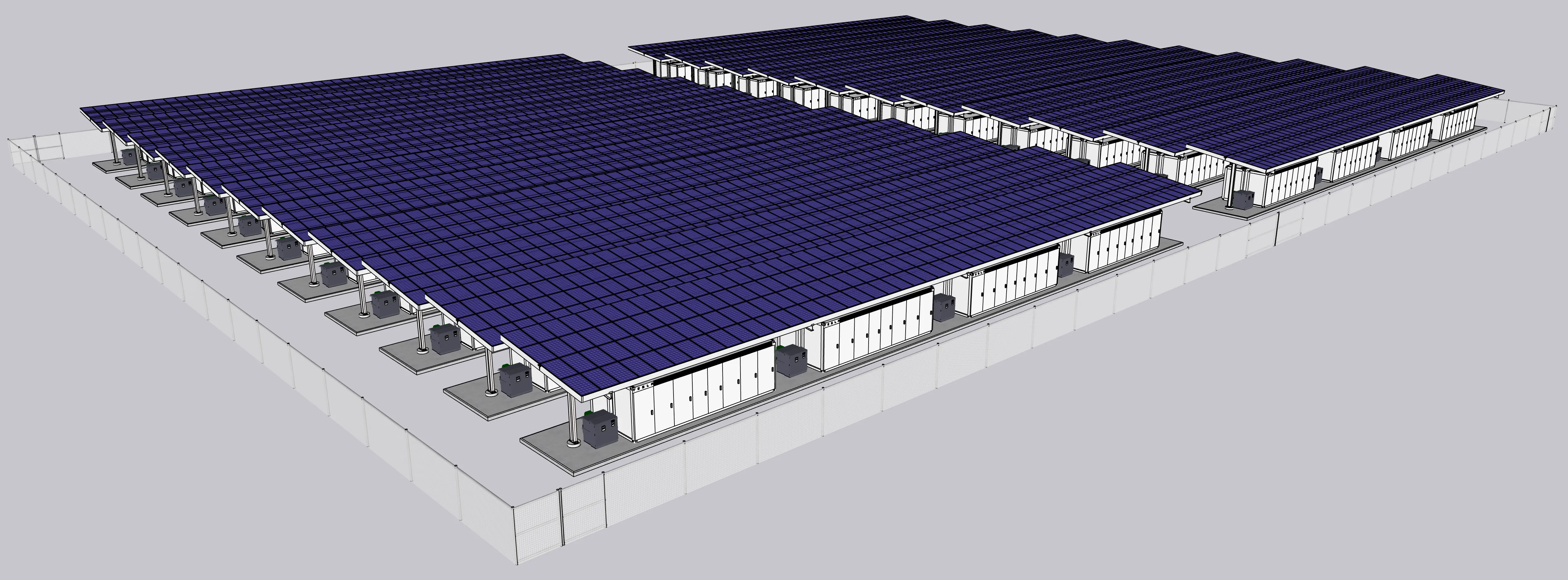
Tesla Megapack site with solar canopies 3D sketch

Grid batteries are used for ancillary services such as control of frequency and phase, black start, operating reserve etc.

=== Peak power ===
Megapacks are designed for large-scale energy storage. Megapacks are used by utilities to replace or augment peaker power plants, which generate energy during periods of peak demand. Megapacks store grid energy rather than generating it from fuel.

=== Time shifting ===
In some areas, energy storage has become a requirement to help convert intermittent energy sources such as wind and solar into firm power.

Other energy storage solutions, such as pumped hydroelectric storage, dominate the time-shift market. As of 2019, pumped hydroelectric storage accounted for 96% of global energy storage capacity. Pumped hydroelectric storage systems have lower efficiency, but longer lifetimes than battery storage.

Batteries may be deployed more quickly than other storage technologies.

=== Supercharger stations ===
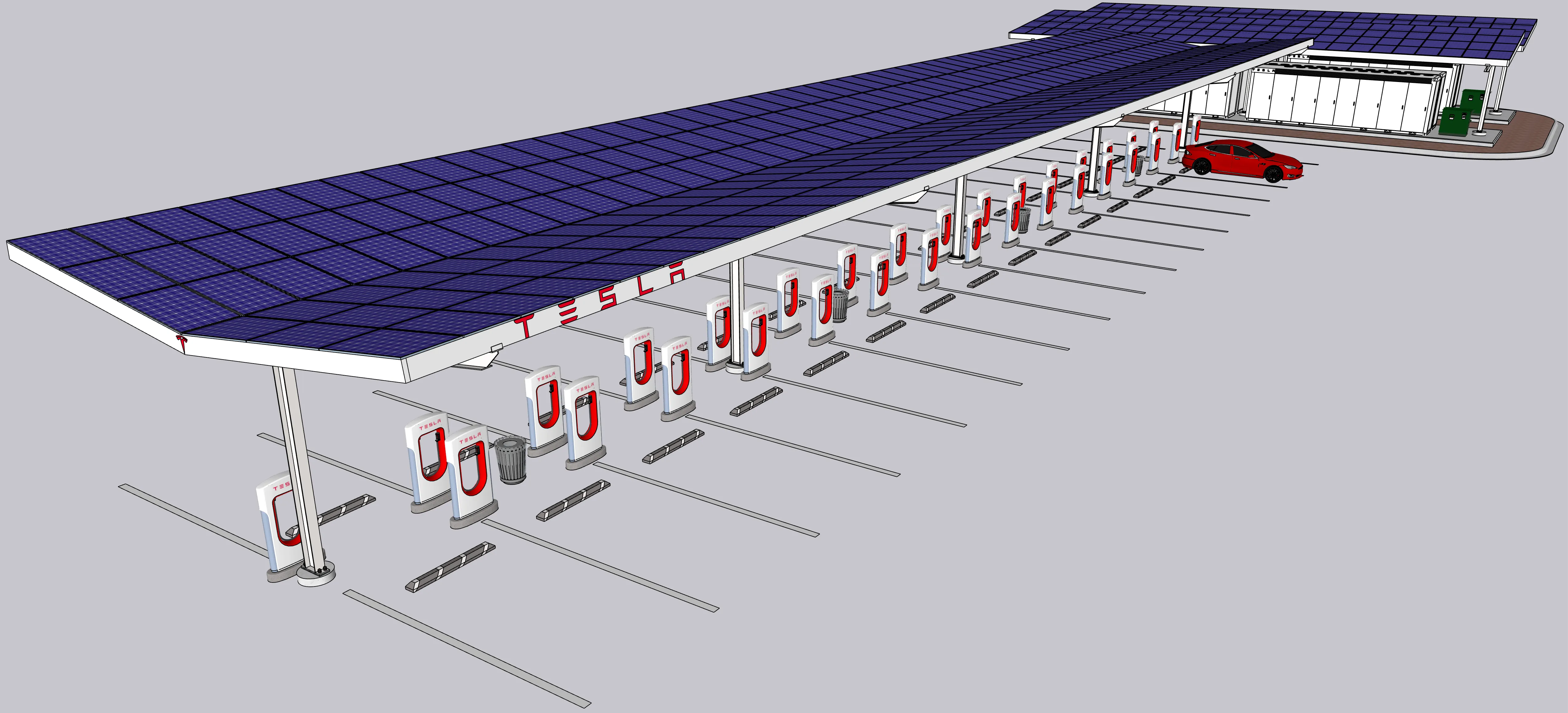
3D sketch of Tesla Supercharger station with solar canopies and 8 Megapack set for close to 32 MWh

Megapacks have been installed at Tesla Supercharger stations that also have solar canopies to help power the Megapacks. Megapacks can smooth out electric demand on the local power grid and use the stored Megapacks electricity during peak demand so there are not excessive surcharges on electricity to charge the electric vehicles. To support summer travel Tesla claimed in July 2025 to have connected for the first time a mobile Megapack to a European Supercharger, the Otočac station in Croatia.

== Deployments ==
=== Completed ===
In November 2019, Tesla used a Megapack to power a mobile recharging station for Tesla electric vehicles in California. The mobile Supercharger delivered 125 kW, and was transported on a flat trailer attached to a truck between deployment locations.

In December 2019, Tesla delivered a 1.25 MW/2.5 MWh Megapack to the Millidgeville Substation in Saint John, Canada for peak shaving. The battery is estimated to save owner Saint John Energy CA$200,000 per year. It became operational on April 3, 2020.

The 300 MW/450 MWh Victorian Big Battery near Geelong, Australia, constituted the largest battery in the southern hemisphere at the time. The commissioning process was halted due to a fire (see "Safety" section), and the lessons learned were applied to other batteries. The battery was commissioned on time in December 2021, a year after contract, with an estimated return on investment of 2.4.

In December 2021, Strata Solar, an American commercial solar services provider, deployed a 100 MW/400 MWh energy storage facility in Ventura County, California, using 142 Megapacks. The deployment replaced a natural-gas peaker plant.

As of June 2022, Pacific Gas and Electric Company (PG&E) operates a 182.5 MW/730 MWh 256-Megapack system at Moss Landing, in Monterey County, California.

TransAlta owns and operates a 10 MW/20 MWh Megapack system near Pincher Creek, Alberta, Canada, which was completed in October 2020. As of July 2024, it is one of ten active storage sites in Alberta, and all are Megapacks.

== Safety ==
Grid-scale battery standards and fire containment practices are at an early stage of development.

Fire risks are one factor that has delayed the deployment of some utility energy storage systems. Most battery fires cannot be extinguished with water, which is the primary firefighting technique in most communities. A fire in a single cell can cascade to others via thermal runaway, possibly in milliseconds, potentially creating a major hazard.

Preventing fires involves multiple layers of protection. First, is to prevent fire in a single cell, by eliminating sparks and short circuits. However, grid-scale systems face potential problems such as coolant leaks and faulty installation. Venting flammable gases and improved insulation reduce cascade risks. Placing controls outside of the container gives more management options. Instead of suppressants, monitoring the situation while watering surrounding areas can help contain the fire. Sensors that track local weather conditions can help avoid overheating. Lithium-free designs with lower fire risks are possible.

"Plume modeling" attempts to predict how gases from burning battery chemicals might travel. The gases produced vary across battery types, hydrogen fluoride (HF) is of particular concern even at low concentrations. A later plume analysis by Vistra reported that concentrations of HF above California exposure limits could spread across an area 1300 feet in diameter under wind conditions that occur 7 percent of the year.

In Raquette Lake, New York, the town passed a one-year moratorium preventing battery installation in response to protests citing fires at three New York battery installations. Protestors cited a fire in Lyme, New York that burned for four days.

A Megapack ignited at Pacific Gas and Electric's (PG&E's) Moss Landing, California facility in September 2022. The fire led to a day-long shelter-in-place advisory. PG&E stated that safety measures included thermal alarms that can shut down the system, an incident command center, an audible evacuation alarm, pre-fire planning with local fire crews and emergency shut down protocols. Heat-suppression systems, intended to curb thermal runaway, were accidentally triggered, dousing batteries in water that caused arcing and short circuiting. The plant was shut down for months. Vistra's third installation in Moss Landing adopted the outdoor container model instead of putting the racks under a single roof. (Vistra stated that the outdoor design was chosen to expedite construction.)

In July 2021, one of the 212 Megapack modules at the Victorian Big Battery project caught fire due to a coolant leak while the battery was unmonitored. That ignited the adjacent Megapack. Three days later, the fire had burnt itself out as preferred by the fire department.

A 50 MW / 100 MWh battery project using Tesla Megapack 2 was under construction in Bouldercombe near Rockhampton, Queensland. The alternating current section caught fire in September 2023 and spread to the cells of one Megapack module, also damaging the adjacent module. Both modules are being replaced by Tesla. Other 36 modules were operational a couple of days later.

== See also ==
- Tesla Supercharger Station
