= Brockton Brightfield =

Solar power plant in Massachusetts, USA

- Country: United States
- Location: Brockton, Massachusetts
- Coordinates: 42°04′30″N 71°00′48″W
- Status: Operational
- Commission date: October 26, 2006

Solar farm
- Type: Flat-panel PV
- Site area: 3.7 acres (0.0 km^{2})

Power generation
- Units operational: 1,395
- Nameplate capacity: 425 kW

Brockton Brightfield in Brockton, Massachusetts is a solar power plant in New England. Consisting of 1,395 photovoltaic panels on a 3.7-acre (1.5 ha) site, it has a maximum output of 425 kilowatts. It was officially opened on October 26, 2006, on the site of the former Brockton Gas Works.

When built, the site was said to be the largest "brightfield" in the U.S., although other developments since then are larger. "Brightfield" is a term for an abandoned industrial site that has been turned into a solar-power facility. It is a blend of the words "bright" and "brownfield", the latter referring to abandoned, often polluted, industrial sites that have been redeveloped.

It was the largest photovoltaic site in New England for several years, but was surpassed by several utility-owned sites in 2010.

== See also ==
- Solar landfill
