= Victorian Big Battery =

Power station in Victoria, Australia

- Country: Australia
- Location: Moorabool
- Coordinates: 38°02′S 144°17′E
- Status: Operational
- Commission date: 8 December 2021
- Owner: HMC Capital
- Operator: Unknown

Power generation
- Nameplate capacity: 300 MW
- Storage capacity: 450 MW h

External links
- Website: victorianbigbattery.com.au

The Victorian Big Battery is a grid-connected battery energy storage system (BESS) facility adjacent to the Moorabool Terminal Station (substation) near Geelong in Victoria, Australia and is owned by HMC Capital. The battery provides 450 MWh of storage and can discharge at 300 MW. It surpasses the 250 MWh Gateway Energy Storage in California, United States. When it was commissioned in December 2021, the project was the largest lithium-ion battery in the Southern Hemisphere.

The Victorian Big Battery was built by French renewable energy producer Neoen. Funding of $160 million was provided by the Clean Energy Finance Corporation, the Australian government's green bank.

Construction started at the beginning of 2021. It commenced operations on 8 December 2021. It uses Tesla Megapack storage units, an electric accumulator designed specifically for large-scale projects.

The battery aims to prevent blackouts during periods of network instability by providing grid support services, capturing and storing excess energy from sources such as wind farms, and feeding it into the grid during peak periods or outages to support Victoria's electricity supply. The battery will store enough energy to power more than half a million Victorian homes for an hour, or the homes of a population equivalent of Geelong (the city where it is situated) for two hours.

== Construction ==
Construction began in January 2021. The battery was scheduled to be commissioned in the Australian summer period 2021-2022 and has been in operation since December 8, 2021. For Neoen's battery, the EPC (Engineering, Procurement and Construction) contractor is Tesla, using UGL as the prime contractor. The connection assets are being provided by AusNet Services, with Downer as the prime contractor.

The storage unit uses 212 Tesla Megapacks, each with a capacity of 3 MWh. This will be the first time Megapacks have been used in a facility of this scale in Australia.

The battery is being built within AusNet's Moorabool Power Terminal in close proximity to the 500 KV high voltage line so that power can be sent quickly to where it is needed.

Construction of the battery was supported by a $160 million loan from the Clean Energy Finance Corporation, an agency owned by the Australian federal government.

== Services ==
Following a tender issued by the Victorian Government in 2020, Neoen was awarded a contract by the Australian Energy Market Operator to reserve approximately 80% of its capacity during the summer months to provide 250 MW of System Integrity Protection Scheme (SIPS) services. This will increase the transfer capacity on the Victorian/New South Wales interconnector during peak consumption periods and reduce the risk of unplanned power outages.

The remaining 50 MW of the battery can be commercially deployed in the market by the operator. Outside the summer period, the battery, with a total capacity of 300 MW, will be operated commercially.

With the services provided by the battery, average industrial electricity consumers could save as much as $280,000 per year on their bills. The Portland aluminium smelter could see its bills drop by as much as $1 million per year.

The battery is tested for grid inertia with 'grid forming' abilities.

== Fire ==
During the initial testing of the energy storage system on 30 July 2021, a fire broke out in one of the Tesla Megapack modules and destroyed two battery units while the fire was left to burn itself out, as recommended. No injuries were reported. The battery pack had been placed into offline mode before the fire, and this had also isolated the monitoring and management systems. The site was disconnected from the grid, with no impact on the power supply. The system was isolated, and energisation testing was not permitted to resume until 29 September 2021. The cause of the fire was determined to have been a leak of cooling fluid that short-circuited cells to thermal runaway. Subsequent configuration changes mean that the monitoring remains active on offline battery packs.
