= Solar canopy =

Arrays on structures built over land with other uses

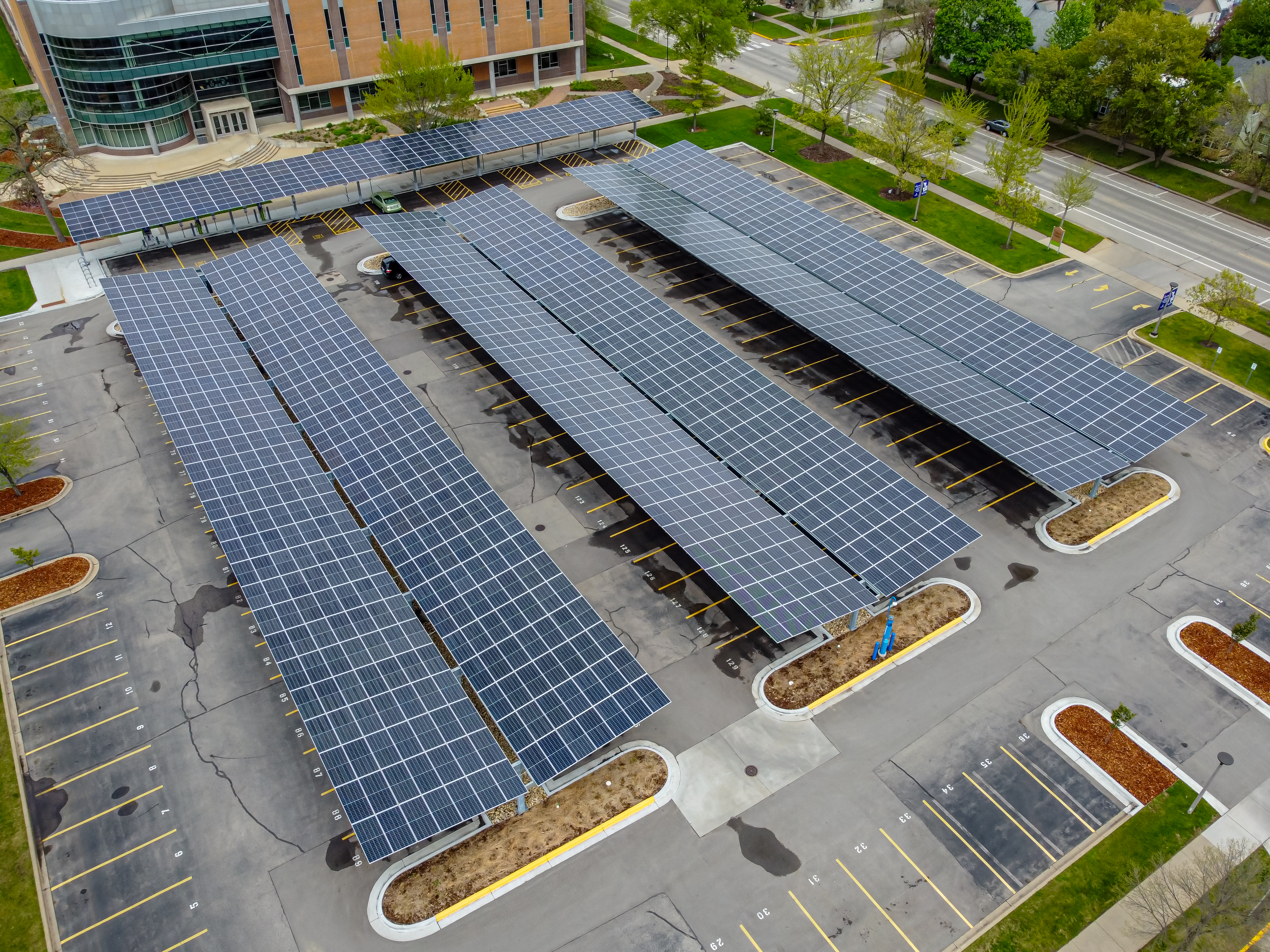
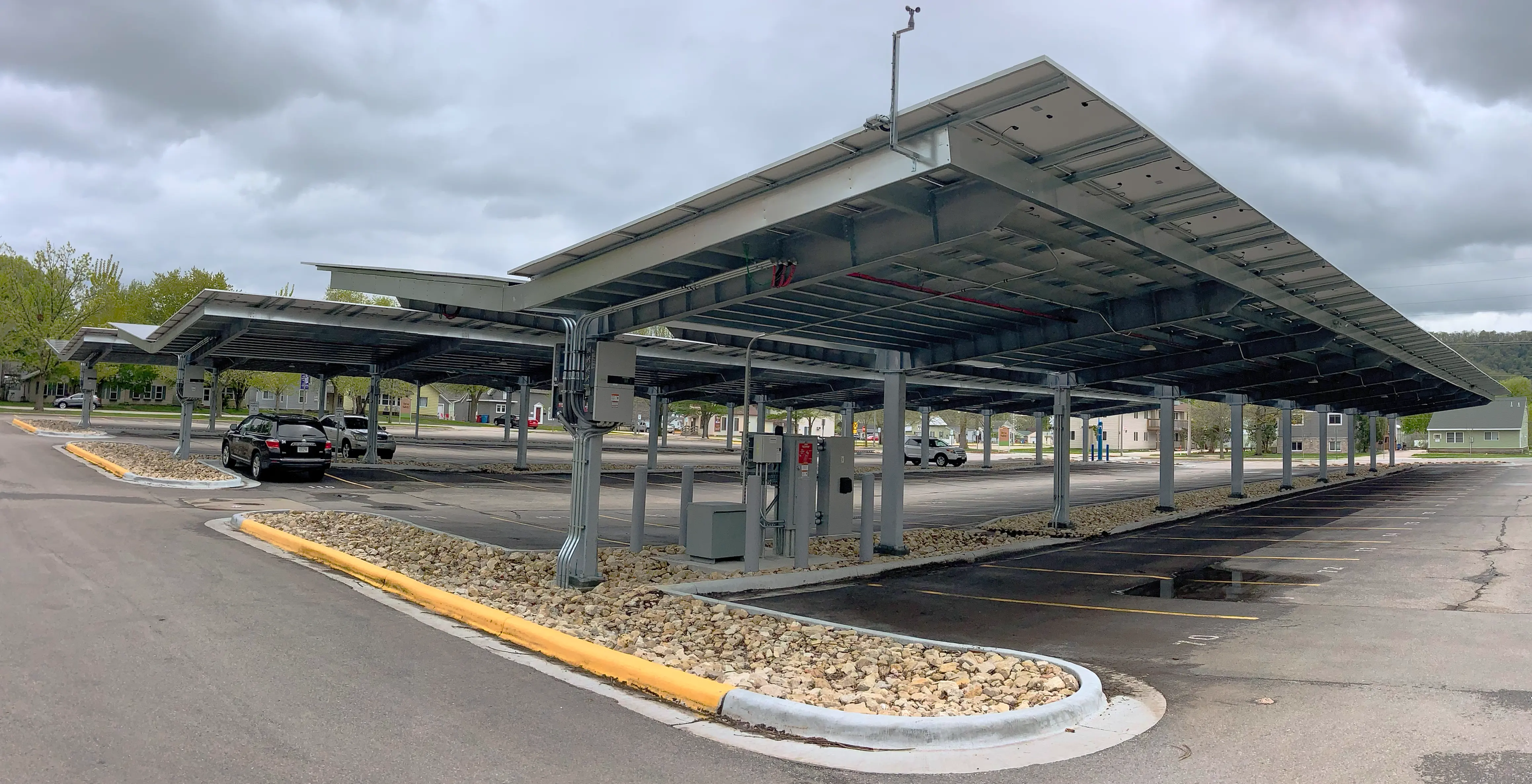
Solar canopy in parking lot at WSU in Minnesota.

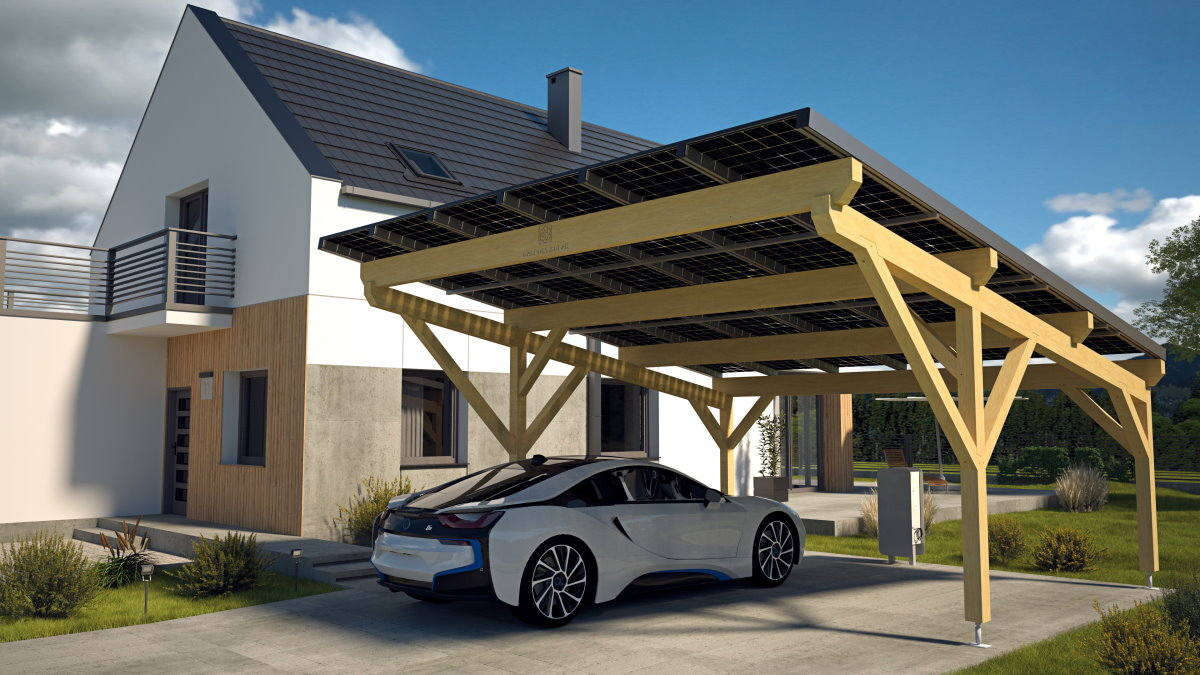
Carport solar canopy

Solar canopies are solar arrays installed on canopies, which could be a parking lot canopy, carport, gazebo, Pergola, or patio cover.

== Solar canopy parking lots ==
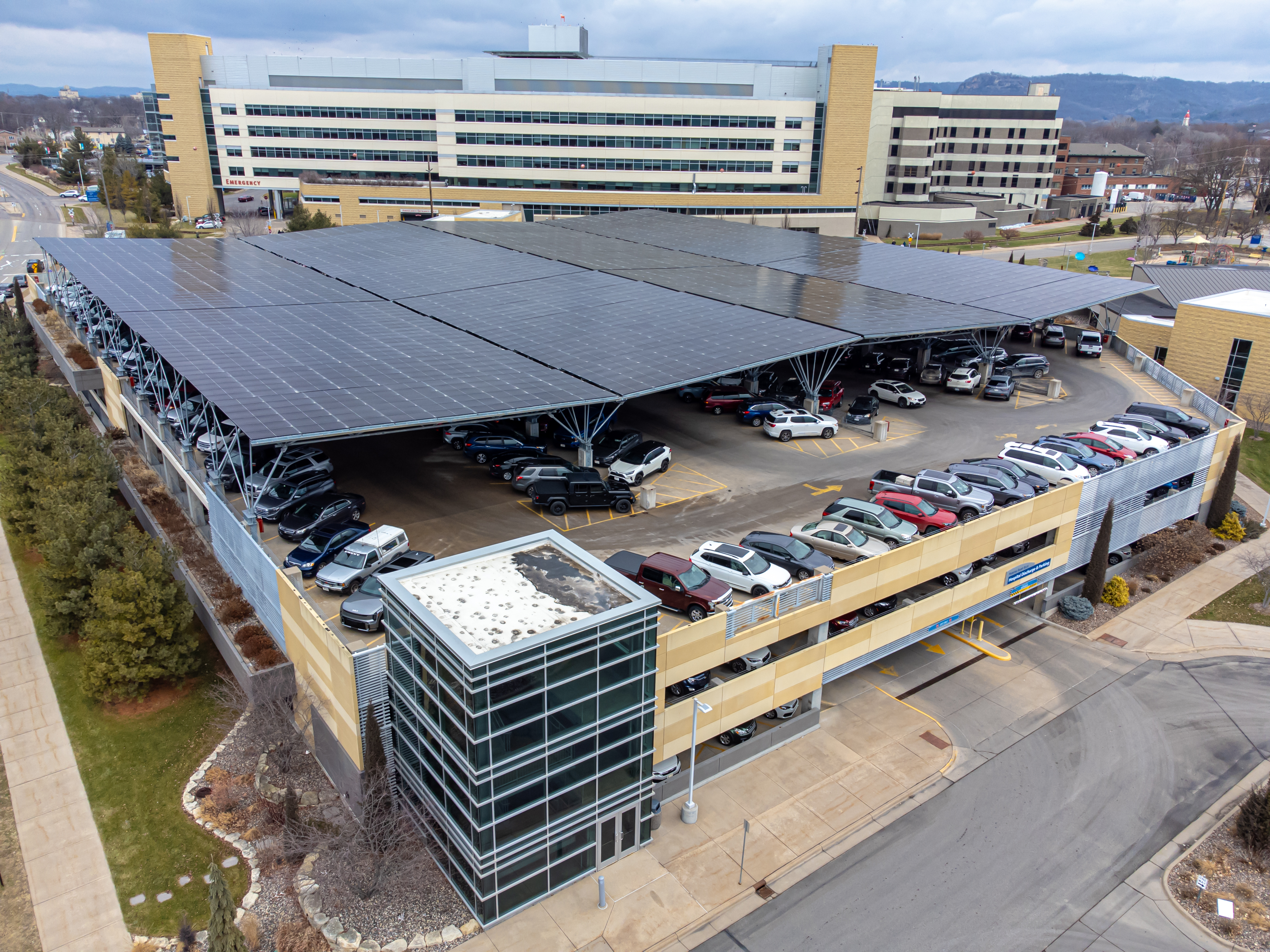
Solar canopy parking ramp Gundersen Hospital

The mounting structure makes solar canopy parking lots 50% to twice as expensive to build as traditional grass field solar arrays, but as distributed energy resources they avoid transmission congestion and losses. The canopies can protect the cars and asphalt from extreme weather.

A French law passed in 2023 will require parking lots larger than 50,000 square feet (4,600 m^{2}) to build solar canopies covering half their area. This could result in installed capacity of 6.75–11.25 gigawatts, at a cost of $8.7–14.6 billion.

In 2022, the world's largest solar car park canopy opened in the Netherlands with 35 MW capacity. A 17 MW car park canopy opened in Germany in 2025.

Rutgers University built 14.5 MW of solar canopies on parking lots in 2023, which will generate 18 GWh annually, in addition to the 32-acre 8.8 MW solar canopy parking lot already installed there in 2013.

If Walmart Supercenters installed solar canopies on their 3,500+ parking lots it would generate 11.1 gigawatts of solar power nameplate capacity.

Many canopy projects may use the community solar mechanism for electricity sales.

A 2023 comparison of monopitch, duopitch and louvered photovoltaic carport structures found that the monopitch configuration produced the most energy under the conditions studied.

== Gazebos ==
At parks or backyard patios, gazebos can be installed as a solar canopy. Some studies have looked into the development solar gazebos that rotate in order to follow sunlight as another option for solar energy. These solar panels operate on a rotating roof gazebo system which allows the solar panels to turn towards the sun as it moves throughout the day. This allows for the solar panels to have direct sunlight throughout most of the day unlike stationary solar panels that will only receive full sunlight for a limited period of time. Due to this, rotating solar gazebos can produce a higher percent of solar energy.

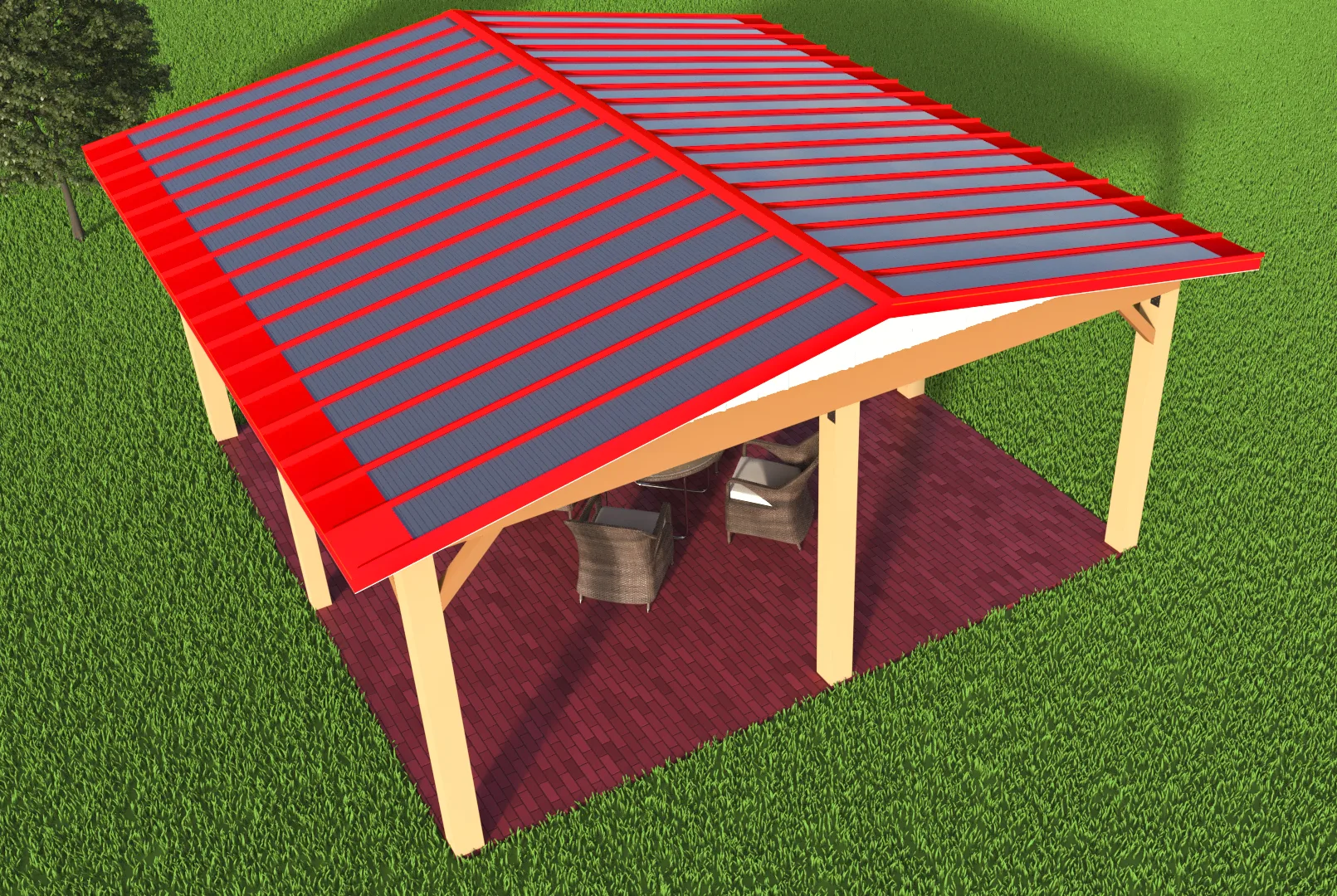
Thin film solar on standing seam metal roof gazebo 3D sketch

== Rooftop canopies ==
Small rooftops and rooftop decks can support solar canopy structures that share space with usable areas.

== Electric vehicle charging stations with solar canopies ==
Some Tesla Supercharger stations have solar canopies installed to protect drivers and vehicles from the elements while recharging. Tesla Megapacks are also installed at some of these locations to store that energy locally.

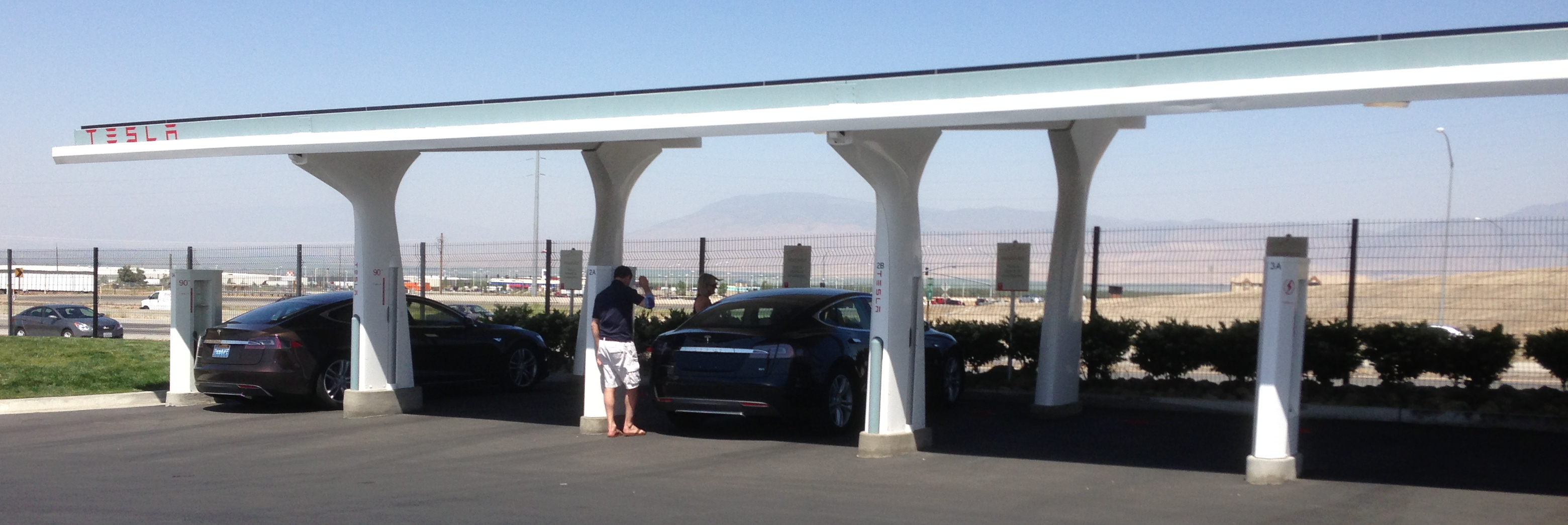
One of the earliest supercharger stations in the United States, located in Lebec, California, has a solar canopy from Tesla Energy.

== See also ==
- Solar landfill
- Balcony solar power
