= Tesla Powerwall =

Home battery energy storage product manufactured by Tesla Energy

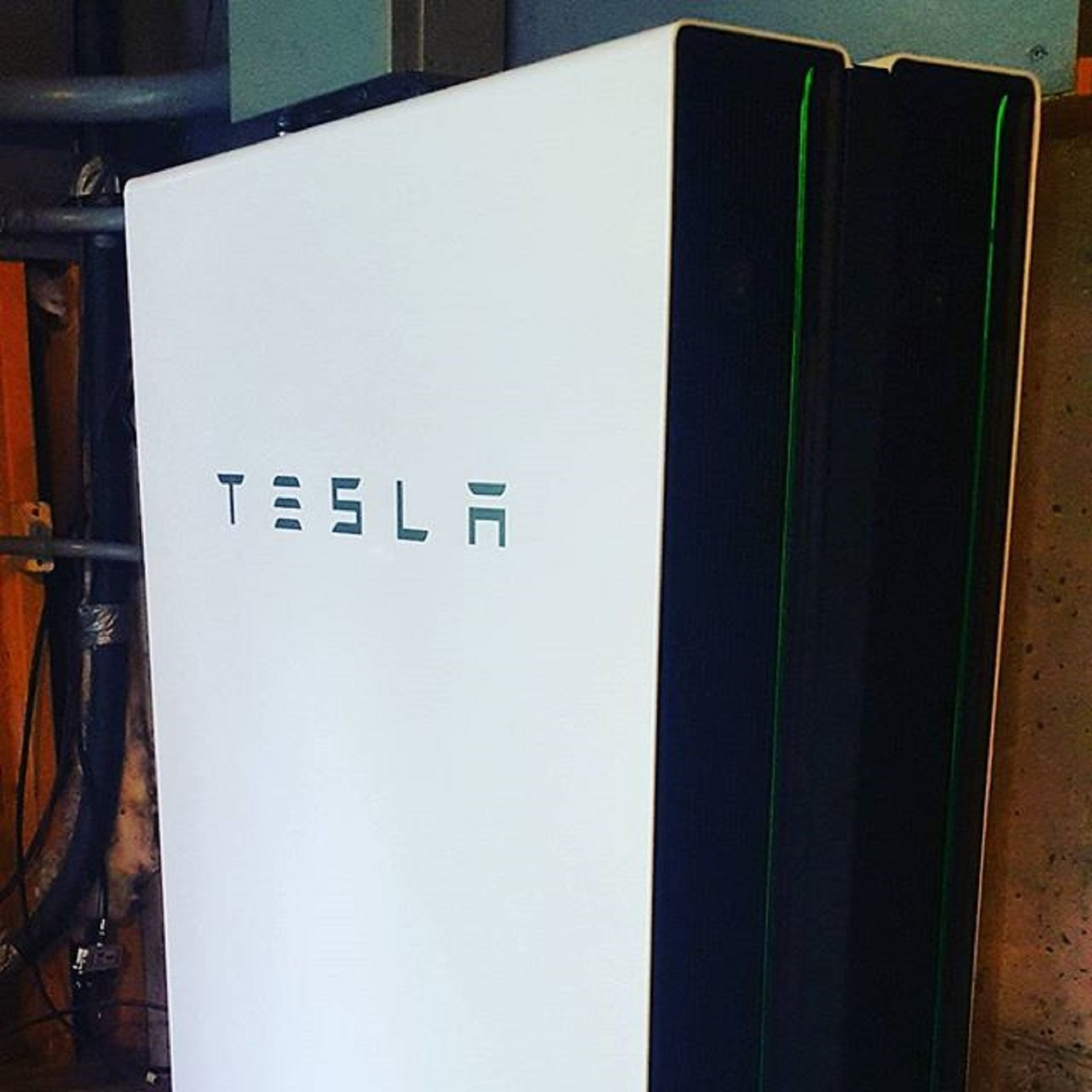
- Two Tesla Powerwall 2 devices in a "stacked" configuration at a home in New York
- Type: Home energy storage battery
- Inception: April 30, 2015
- Manufacturer: Tesla Energy
- Models: Tesla Powerwall 2; Tesla Powerwall+; Tesla Powerwall 3
- Website: tesla.com/powerwall

The Tesla Powerwall is a rechargeable lithium-ion battery stationary home energy storage product manufactured by Tesla Energy. The Powerwall stores electricity for solar self-consumption, time of use load shifting, and backup power.

The Powerwall was introduced in 2015 as Powerwall 1 with limited production. A larger model—Powerwall 2—went into mass production in early 2017 at Tesla's Giga Nevada factory, with a more capable model with an internal DC–to–AC inverter—Powerwall 3—entering production in late 2023. The millionth Powerwall was installed in 2025.

== History ==
As Tesla Motors (now Tesla, Inc.) developed batteries for its electric car business, it also started experimenting with using batteries for energy storage. Starting in 2012, Tesla installed prototype battery packs (later developed into the Tesla Powerpack) at the locations of a few industrial customers.

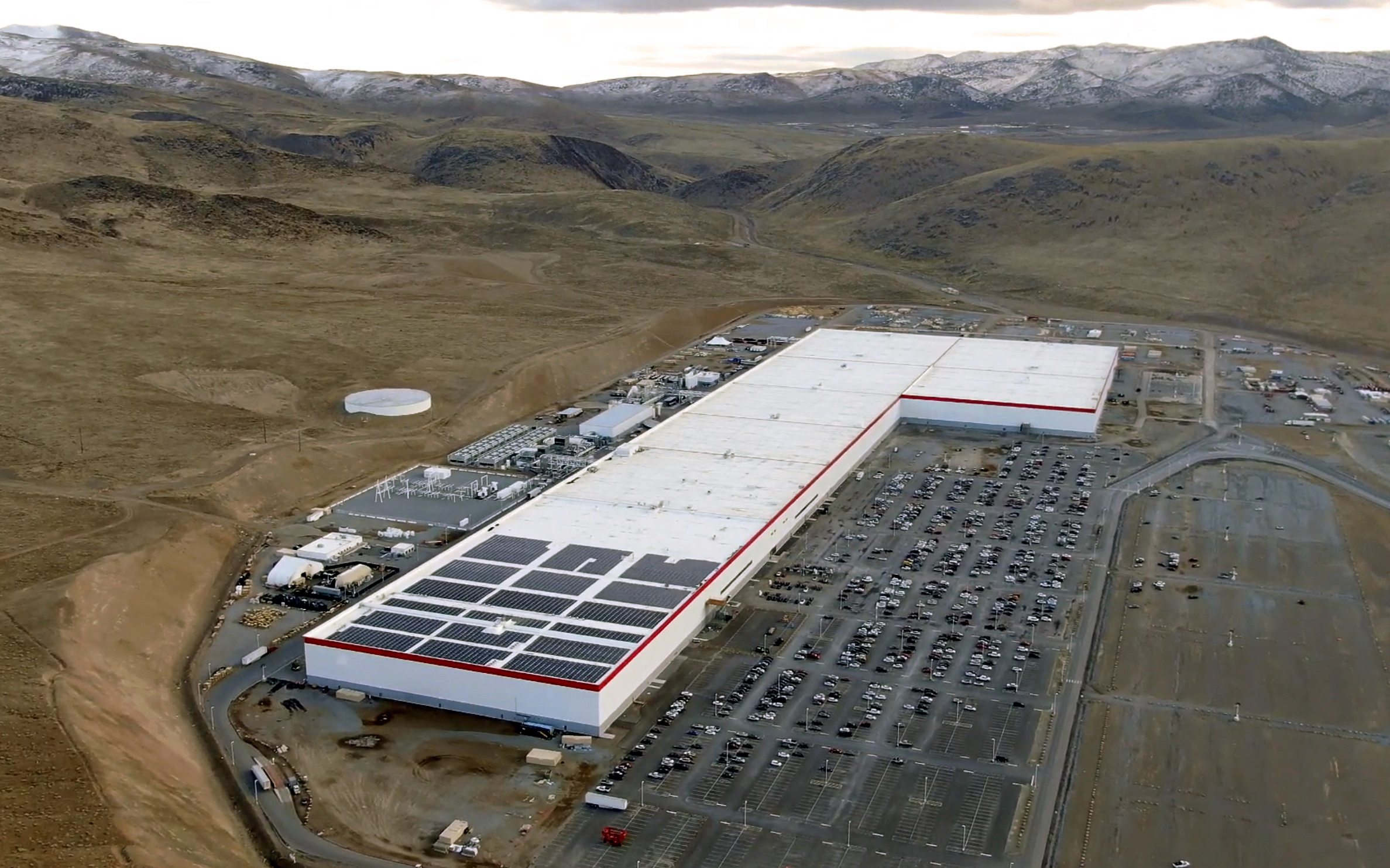
Giga Nevada, Tesla, Inc.'s battery factory where the Powerwall is made

In November 2013, Tesla announced that it would build Giga Nevada, a factory to produce lithium-ion batteries.

On April 30, 2015, the company announced that it would apply its battery technology to a home energy storage system: the Powerwall. The device would allow customers to store electricity for solar self-consumption, time-of-use load-shifting, and backup power.

The device was initially announced to have power output of 2 kilowatt (kW) continuous and 3.3 kW peak, but CEO Elon Musk said at the June 2015 Tesla shareholders meeting that this would be more than doubled to 5 kW steady with 7 kW peak, with no increase in price. Two models of Powerwall were planned: a 7 kilowatt-hour (kWh) capacity model for daily cycle use (solar self-consumption, time of use load shifting) and a higher capacity 10 kWh model for customers who also wanted backup power. By March 2016, however, Tesla had removed all references to its 10 kWh battery from the Powerwall website, as well as the company's press kit. The production units would ultimately offer a capacity of 6.4 kWh.

Five hundred pilot units were built and installed during 2015, each being built at the Tesla Fremont Factory. The Giga Nevada factory started limited production of Powerwalls and Powerpacks in January 2016 using battery cells produced elsewhere, and began mass production of cells in January 2017.

The Powerwall 2 was unveiled in October 2016 at Universal Studios' Colonial Street backlot set. The Powerwall 2 had a 13.5 kWh capacity and was capable of delivering 5 kW of power continuously and up to 7 kW of peak power in short bursts (up to 10 seconds). Powerwall 2 devices were paired with a device called the Backup Gateway, which acted as a transfer switch and a load center.

In April 2020, Tesla announced that it had installed 100,000 Powerwalls, five years after introducing the product.

Tesla started making several refinements to the Powerwall in 2021. On April 26, during the First Quarter 2021 Financial Results call with investors, the company announced that it had been quietly shipping upgraded versions of the Powerwall 2 since November 2020, which could deliver higher amounts of power, and that the functionality would be enabled via an over-the-air software update. Just a few days later, on April 29, the company started filing for building permits for projects that would use the Powerwall+, a device that combines the functions of a Powerwall 2, the Tesla Backup Gateway and the Tesla Solar Inverter. The combination simplifies installation and allows for even greater power delivery during periods of full sun.

In May 2021, Tesla announced that it had installed 200,000 Powerwalls, selling 100,000 devices in a single year, the same amount that the company had previously taken five years to achieve. The next month, in July 2021, Musk revealed that the company had a backlog of 80,000 Powerwall orders, but due to the global chip shortage, the company would only be able to make fewer than 35,000 units in the quarter.

In October 2026, more than 85,000 Powerwalls in California together delivered 601 MW during a peak demand event. The output is equal to the output of a natural gas plant.

== Powerwall models ==
Tesla has offered several models of the Powerwall since its introduction in April 2015.

The original Powerwall (retroactively referred to as the Powerwall 1) has a 6.4 kWh capacity and is capable of delivering 3.3 kW of power.

Tesla introduced an improved Powerwall 2 in October 2016 with a 13.5 kWh capacity and capable of delivering 5 kW of power continuously and up to 7 kW of peak power in short bursts (up to 10 seconds). Later versions of the Powerwall 2, shipped after November 2020, had the same capacity, but can deliver 5.8 kW of power continuously and up to 10 kW of peak power. The Powerwall+, introduced in April 2021, combines the functions of a Powerwall 2, a Backup Gateway and a solar inverter. Up to 10 Powerwall 2 or Powerwall+ units may be combined to expand the capacity and maximum power of the system. The Powerwall 2 was discontinued on November 15, 2025.

Powerwall 3 began rollout in September 2023 with a major power increase to 11.5 kW from the 5 kW of Powerwall 2. Like the earlier Powerwall+ it includes an integrated solar inverter, but instead of separate solar and battery assemblies, the two are integrated into a single device, with more functional rectangular packaging that requires less wall space, aimed at easier installation and more capability in a single cabinet on the customer premises.

Model	Introduced	Price (US$) (Note: Installation cost not included)	Capacity (kWh)	Expandable (ganged operation)	Maximum Power			Weight	Dimensions, H × W × D	Operating temperature	Cycles (during 10 year warranty)
Model	Introduced	Price (US$)	Capacity (kWh)	Expandable (ganged operation)	Continuous	Peak (10 seconds)	Locked Rotor Amps	Weight	Dimensions, H × W × D	Operating temperature	Cycles (during 10 year warranty)
Powerwall 1 (discontinued)	April 2015		7		2 kW		Unknown	209 lb (95 kg)	51.2 in × 33.9 in × 7.1 in (130 cm × 86 cm × 18 cm)	−4 to 110 °F (−20 to 43 °C)	5,000
Powerwall 1 (discontinued)	April 2015	$3,000	7		3.3 kW		Unknown	209 lb (95 kg)	51.2 in × 33.9 in × 7.1 in (130 cm × 86 cm × 18 cm)	−4 to 110 °F (−20 to 43 °C)	5,000
Powerwall 1 (discontinued)	April 2015		10		6.6 kW		Unknown	223 lb (101 kg)	51.2 in × 33.9 in × 7.1 in (130 cm × 86 cm × 18 cm)	−4 to 110 °F (−20 to 43 °C)	5,000
Powerwall 2 (discontinued)	October 2016	$5,500, later $6,500	13.5 (usable)	10	5 kW	7 kW	Unknown	251 lb (114 kg)	45.3 in × 29.5 in × 5.5 in (115 cm × 75 cm × 14 cm)	−4 to 122 °F (−20 to 50 °C)	Unlimited (Used for solar self-consumption, time of use load shifting or backup power); 37.8 MWh of aggregate throughput (other applications)
Powerwall 2 (discontinued)	November 2020	$7,500	13.5 (usable)	10	5.8 kW	10 kW	88-106A	251 lb (114 kg)	45.3 in × 29.5 in × 5.5 in (115 cm × 75 cm × 14 cm)	−4 to 122 °F (−20 to 50 °C)	Unlimited (Used for solar self-consumption, time of use load shifting or backup power); 37.8 MWh of aggregate throughput (other applications)
Powerwall+ (discontinued)	April 2021	$8,500	13.5 (usable)	1+3 or 2+2, 4 total (1–2 Powerwall+, 2–3 Powerwall 2)	5.8 kW (no sun); 7.6 kW (full sun)	10 kW (no sun); 22 kW (full sun)	118A	344 lb (156 kg)	62.8 in × 29.7 in × 6.3 in (159.6 cm × 75.5 cm × 16 cm)	−4 to 122 °F (−20 to 50 °C)	Unlimited (Used for solar self-consumption, time of use load shifting or backup power); 37.8 MWh of aggregate throughput (other applications)
Powerwall 3	September 2023	$7,300	13.5	4	11.5 kW	30 kW	185A	290 lb (130 kg)	43.25 in × 24 in × 7.6 in (109.9 cm × 61.0 cm × 19.3 cm)	−4 to 122 °F (−20 to 50 °C)	Unlimited (Used for solar self-consumption, time of use load shifting or backup power); 37.8 MWh of aggregate throughput (other applications)
Powerwall 3P	February 2026		13.4	4	15.4 kW	21 kW					

== Technology ==
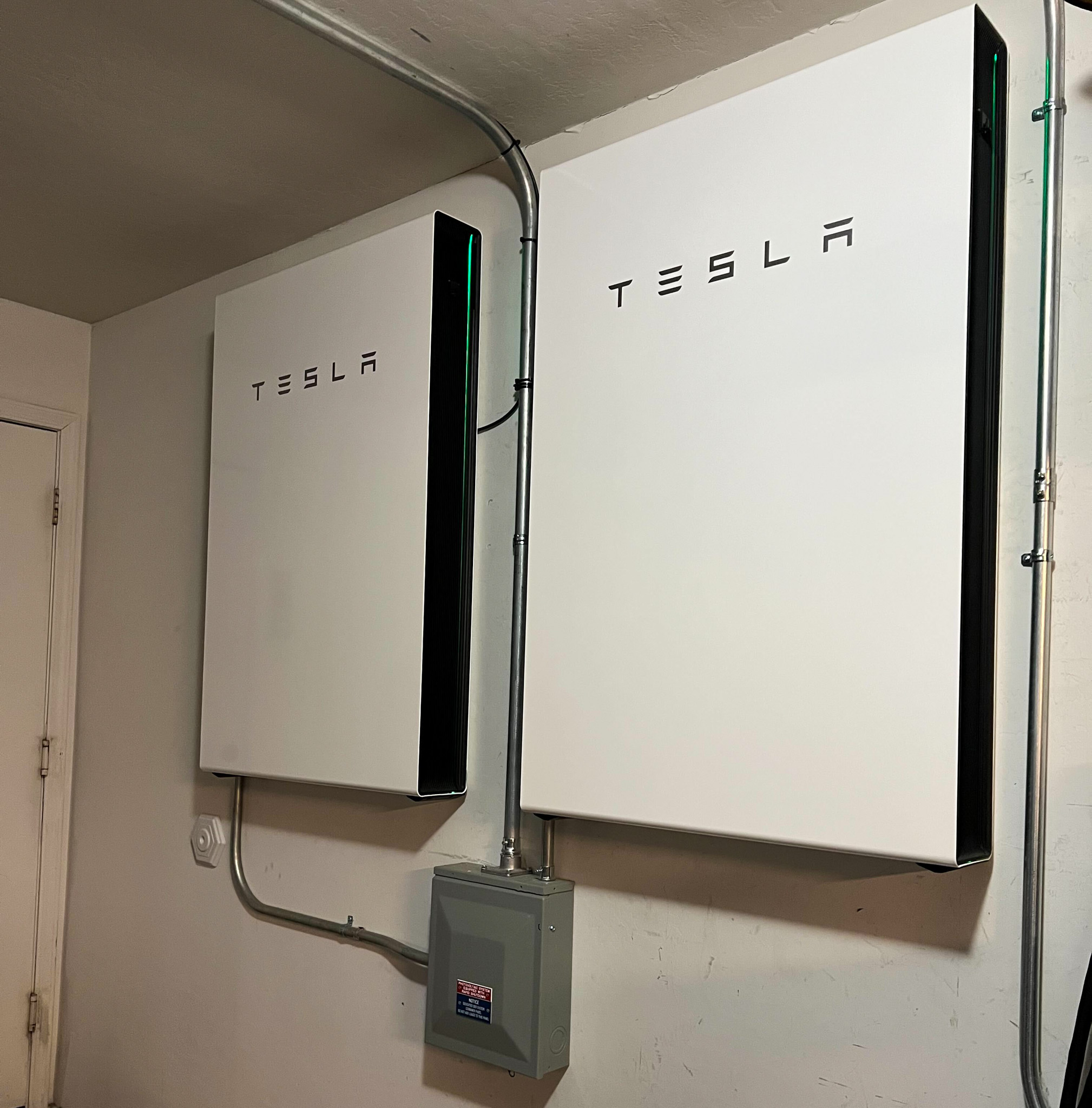
Two Tesla Powerwall 3 units installed indoors in a residential environment

The Powerwall is optimized for daily cycling, such as for load shifting. For Powerwall 1, Tesla used proprietary technology for packaging and cooling the cells in packs with liquid coolant. Musk promised not to start patent infringement lawsuits against anyone who, in good faith, used Tesla's technology for Powerwalls as he had promised with Tesla cars.

The Powerwall 1 battery uses nickel-manganese-cobalt chemistry and can be cycled 5,000 times before warranty expiration. The Powerwall has a 92.5% round-trip efficiency when charged or discharged by a 400–450 V system at 2 kW with a temperature of 77 °F (25 °C) when the product is brand new. Age of the product, temperatures above or below 77 °F (25 °C), and charge rates or discharge rates above 2 kW would lower this efficiency number, decreasing the system performance.

Powerwall 1 includes a DC-to-DC converter to sit between a home's existing solar panels and the home's existing DC to AC inverter. If the existing inverter is not storage-ready, one must be purchased.

Powerwall 2 incorporates a DC-to-AC inverter of Tesla's own design. Its rated roundtrip efficiency (from AC input to AC output) is 90%, when brand-new, and when being charged and discharged at the rate of 3.3 kW at an ambient temperature of 25 degrees C. Its measured RTE is 88%, with a seasonal variation of -3% in summer and +2% in winter, when mounted in an enclosed porch near London. Production of the 2170 cell type for the Powerwall 2 began at Giga Nevada 1 in January 2017.

The National Fire Protection Association conducted two worst-case scenario tests in 2016, igniting Powerpacks to initiate thermal runaway. The design contained damage within the Powerwall structures.

== Return-on-investment calculations ==
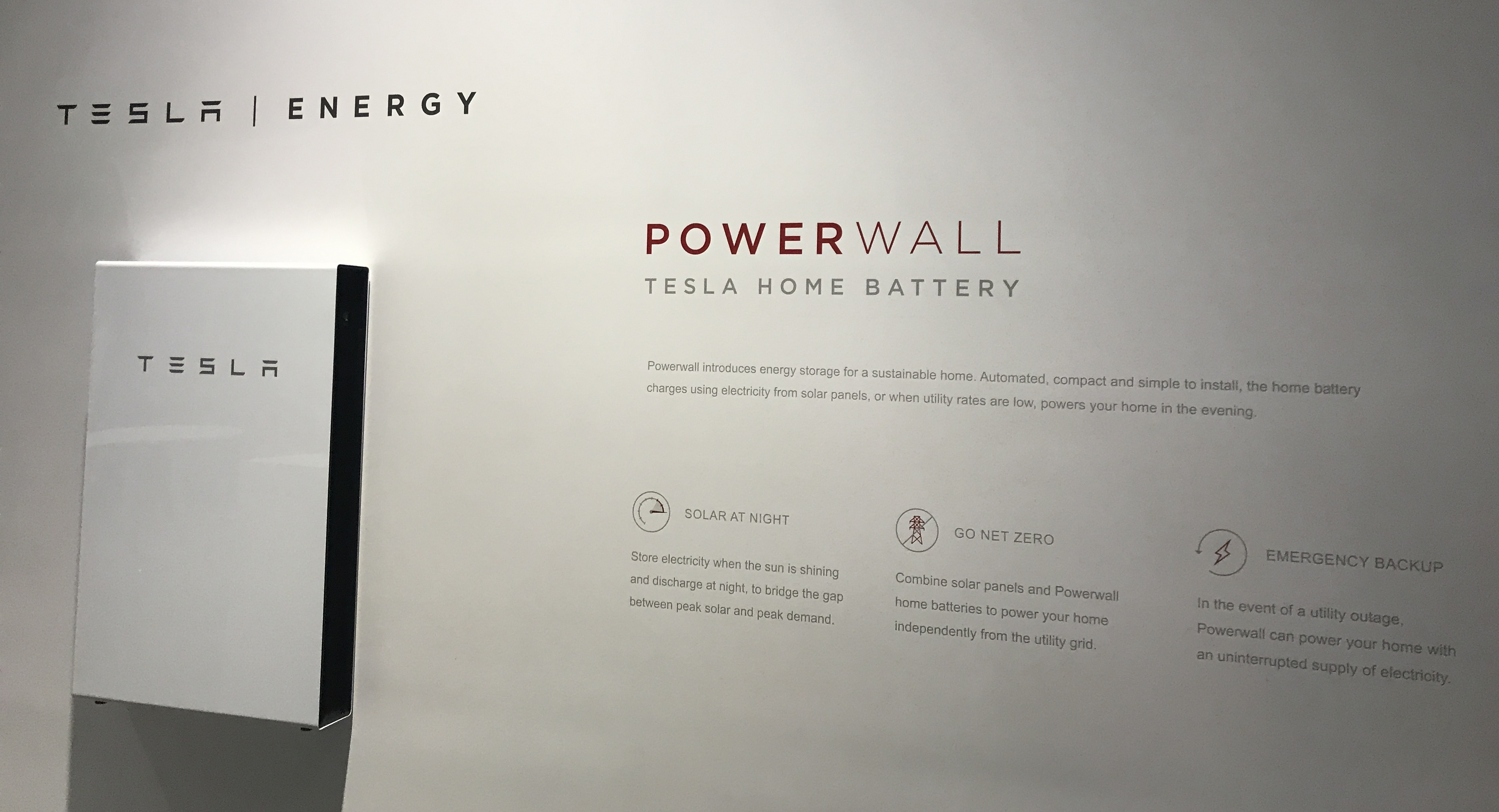
Powerwall 2 on display in the lobby of the Giga Nevada factory

A May 2015 article in Forbes magazine calculated that using a Tesla Powerwall 1 model combined with solar panels in a home would cost 30 cents/kWh for electricity if a home remains connected to the grid (the article acknowledges that the Tesla battery could make economic sense in applications that are entirely off-grid). US consumers got electricity from the power grid for 12.5 cents/kWh on average. The article concludes, as its title indicates, that Tesla's Powerwall "is just another toy for rich green people."

Bloomberg and Catalytic Engineering also agreed that the Tesla system was most useful in places where electricity prices are high. Examples of locations with very high electricity prices are Hawaii and other remote islands that generate electricity with fuel that must be shipped in.

Another possible savings comes from areas with time-of-use (TOU) pricing. For example, northern California's Pacific Gas and Electric Company charged as low as 12 cents/kWh in 2021 during the off-peak hours (12a–3p) and as high as 52 cents/kWh during the peak hours (4p–9p). When configured for cost savings, the Powerwall can allow a home to go off-grid during peak hours, avoiding the highest cost power usage.

The Swiss bank UBS said that the Powerwall makes sense in Australia and Germany where electricity is very costly but solar panels are well distributed.

As of October 2019, the Tesla Powerwall 2 costs $14,600 for the recommended two units (plus $2,500 to $4,500 for installation) in the US; this price does not include the cost of solar panels.

== Recalls and controversies ==
In September 2025, due to fire hazard concerns leading to minor property damage, Powerwall 2 models were recalled in Australia. Models affected were produced between November 2020 and June 2022.

== Competition ==
Since Tesla introduced the Powerwall, many other companies have started offering home battery backup products, especially companies that compete with Tesla Energy to sell photovoltaic solar energy generation systems.

In 2023, Powerwall had a 47 percent share of the residential solar-plus-storage market, with Enphase Energy having a 17 percent market share.

== See also ==
- Megapack
- Net metering systems with integrated energy storage
