= Dry electrode process =

Dry electrode process (also called solvent-free electrode processing or dry coating) is a method of manufacturing battery electrodes in which the active material and conductive additive are blended as dry powders with a polymeric binder such as polytetrafluoroethylene (PTFE), consolidated either by hot rolling or by shear-induced fibrillation of the binder into a fibrous network, and formed into a free-standing film that is laminated onto a current collector. Because no solvent is used, the process requires neither drying ovens nor solvent-recovery equipment; in conventional slurry casting, drying and solvent recovery account for nearly half of the energy consumed in electrode production, and cathode slurries typically rely on N-methyl-2-pyrrolidone (NMP).

The process originated in supercapacitor manufacturing at Maxwell Technologies, which Tesla acquired in 2019; Tesla later applied it to its 4680 battery cells and reported in January 2026 that both the anode and cathode were being produced dry at Gigafactory Texas. Solvent-free processing has also been studied for all-solid-state batteries.

Because it is not limited by solvent evaporation, dry processing is attractive for thick electrodes, which raise the share of active material in a cell and therefore its energy density; challenges include film fragility, thickness uniformity, and the effect of binder content on rate capability.
