= Gigafactory Nevada =

Tesla, Inc. factory

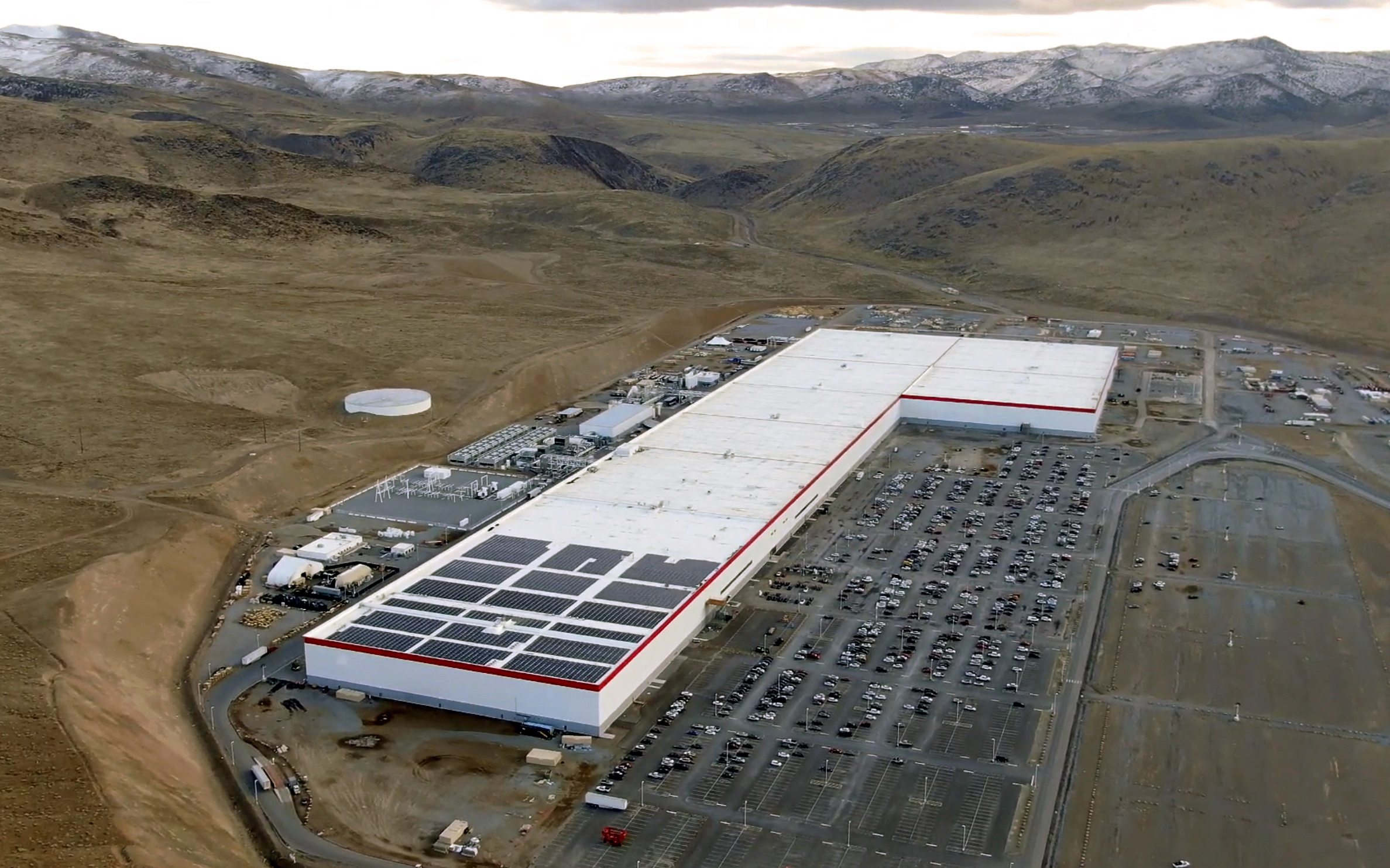
- Drone view of Gigafactory Nevada in December 2019
- Built: 2014–2017
- Operated: January 2016
- Location: Storey County, Nevada, United States
- Coordinates: 39°32′17″N 119°26′24″W
- Industry: Automotive; Renewable energy
- Products: Lithium-ion batteries; Powerwall; Tesla Semi
- Employees: 12,000 (2022)
- Area: Floor area: 5,400,000 sq ft (500,000 m^{2}); Land: 4.5 sq mi (12 km^{2}; 2,900 acres)
- Owner: Tesla, Inc.
- Website: tesla.com/giga-nevada

Gigafactory Nevada (also known as Giga Nevada or Gigafactory 1) is a lithium-ion battery and electric vehicle component factory in Storey County, Nevada, United States. The facility, located east of Reno, is owned and operated by Tesla, Inc. The factory supplies battery packs and drivetrain components (including motors) for the company's electric vehicles, produces the Tesla Powerwall home energy storage device, and assembles the Tesla Semi. It is the largest (by land area) and the first Tesla Gigafactory in the world.

The facility is located at the Tahoe Reno Industrial Center (TRIC) and employed around 7,000 people at the end of 2018, with a goal of hiring thousands more with a total of nearly 10,000 statewide. The factory started limited production of the Tesla Powerwall home energy storage device in January 2016 using battery cells produced elsewhere and began mass production of cells in January 2017. The grand opening event was held on July 29, 2016.

The factory has been designed to become entirely energy self-reliant. Tesla intends to power the structure through a combination of on-site solar, wind and geo-thermal sources. According to Tesla CEO Elon Musk, one hundred factories like Giga Nevada would be necessary to transition the world to sustainable energy consumption without any increase in production density such as switching to a dry electrode coating process.

== History ==
Initial public mention of the gigafactory concept was made in November 2013, although Tesla's internal plans predated that; Tesla had investigated almost 100 sites.

In July 2014, it was announced that Panasonic had reached a basic agreement with Tesla to invest in a factory, estimated to cost $5 billion. The northern Nevada site and plans were announced with state officials on September 4, 2014. Panasonic agreed to lead the battery cell production portion of the manufacturing, and Tesla CEO Elon Musk indicated in 2015 that the total Panasonic investment would be US$1.5–2 billion, and that Tesla would not expand beyond original plans. In early 2016 Panasonic president Kazuhiro Tsuga confirmed a planned total investment of about $1.6 billion by the company to equip the factory to full capacity. However, after the number of Model 3 reservations became known in April 2016, Panasonic moved production plans forward and announced a bond sale for $3.86 billion, most of it to be invested in Gigafactory.

=== Factory location ===
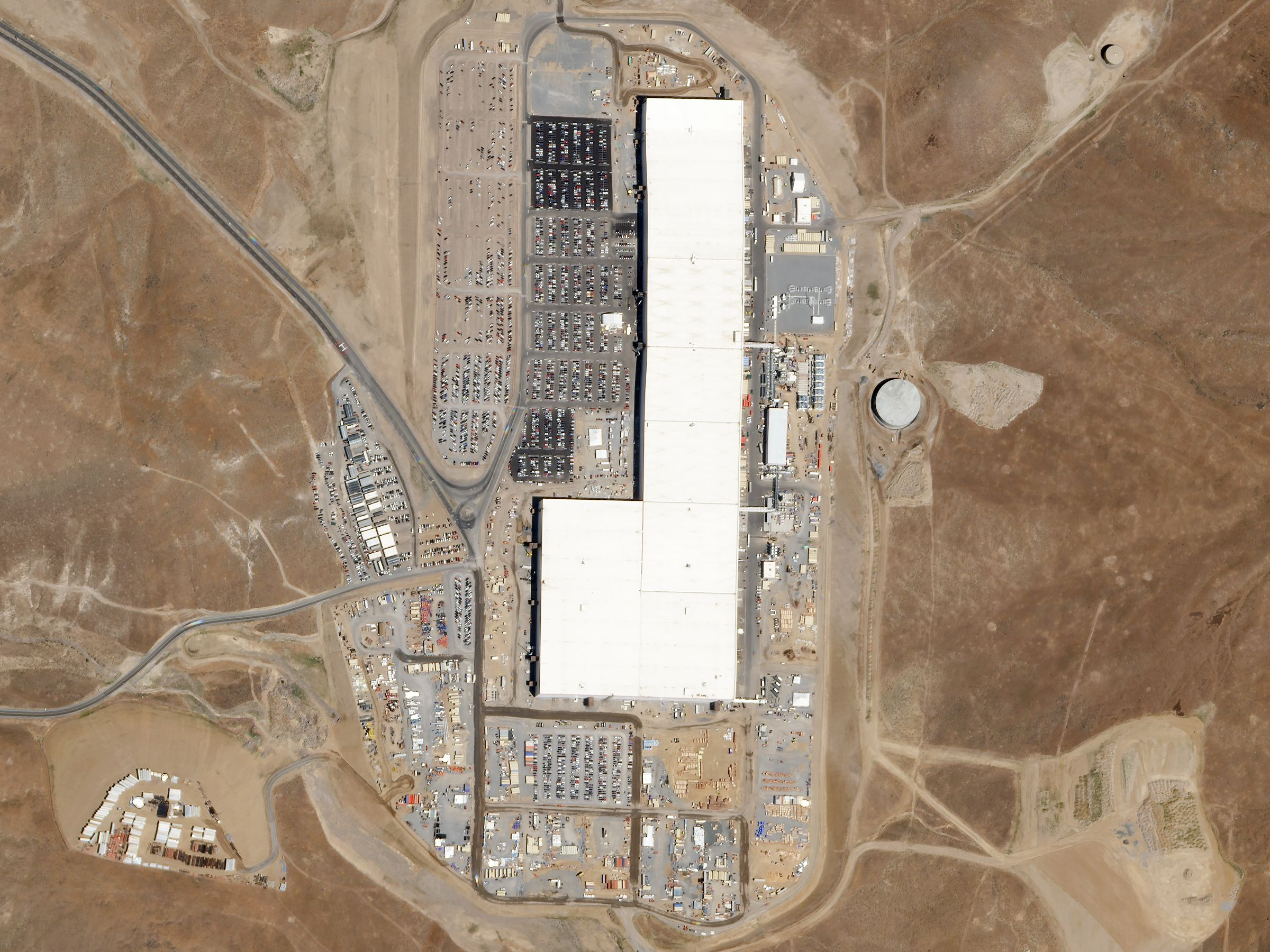
Gigafactory Nevada, bird's eye view

Tesla initially considered several sites, but northern Nevada was not one of them. A manager at Reno–Tahoe International Airport offered some of its 3,000 available acres at Reno Stead Airport, and persuaded TRIC owner to split the bill for a private jet to fly Tesla people to the area. They tried several times, and Tesla eventually came to TRIC and was pleased by the speed of regulatory work.

==== State competition and incentives ====
Tax abatements and credits for Gigafactory until year 2034
1. $725M: 20-year sales tax abatement (56.0%)
2. $332M: 10-year property tax abatement (26.0%)
3. $120M: Investment-dependent tax credits, mostly transferred film tax credits (9.00%)
4. $75M: $12,500-per-job tax credit (6,000 jobs) (6.00%)
5. $27M: 10-year business tax abatement (2.00%)
6. $8M: Discounted electricity rates for eight years (1.00%)

At least five states competed to attract Gigafactory by offering tax abatements, tax credits, cash grants or other incentives: California, Arizona, Nevada, New Mexico, and Texas. San Antonio, Texas was seen as an early leader for offering bigger incentives and for being a state with a sales tax exemption on manufacturing equipment purchases. Overall, states with favorable sales tax regulations were seen as topping the list of preferred sites.

After sticky negotiations, Tesla chose the TRIC as the location of the Gigafactory mainly due to the speed of construction and regulatory work in the state and the State of Nevada's incentive package estimated to be worth $1.287 billion. Other location reasons were rail access, Nevada allowing direct sales of Tesla vehicles, and low air humidity. Additionally, the owners of TRIC agreed to give Tesla 1,000 acres for free, about 35% of the 2,900 acres the company needed.

The incentives package included $195 million in transferable tax credits depending on Tesla's investment in the state and job creation, similar to the Volkswagen Chattanooga Assembly Plant deal and others. Tesla's investments earn them about $10 million in tax credits per quarter, and by July 2016 had sold these for $20 million cash. At the end of 2016, Tesla and Panasonic had 477 employees and 5,591 construction workers, mostly Nevada residents, and invested $1.1b earning $59m in tax credits. By 2019, the gigafactory companies (now with 7,700 employees) had invested a combined $4.9 billion ($3b by Tesla, $1.7b by Panasonic, and $100m by H&T plus some equipment). This qualified the companies for the full tax credit amount of $195 million which were repurposed from other tax credit programs, including movie production incentives, keeping Nevada State tax programs neutral. The development surpassed the original 2014 plan for investments and 6,500 employees. Numbers for construction were $2 billion and 17,000 workers.

The incentive package also includes 20 years free from sales tax and 10 years free from property tax, depending on Tesla's ability to meet performance expectations (like investing $3.5 billion in Nevada). By 2034, this package could accumulate to a value of $1.25 billion; the 10th largest in the US. The $725M sales tax abatement was particularly important, as 5 other states charge no sales tax at all, and 34 states (including Arizona and Texas) don't charge sales tax on manufacturing equipment. With a tax base of $1.9 billion and an incentive package of $1.25 billion, the projected result was calculated as a tax-per-abatement ratio of 1.52. For 2014–2018, tax abatements were $240 million. The nearby data centers from Apple Inc. and Switch also received incentives.

Nevada estimates the construction impact at $2.4 billion and the economic impact from the project at $100 billion over two decades ($5 billion/year, of which $353–378 million are wages) yielding $57 million in state and local taxes. Some economists said that number was "deeply flawed," for instance, it counted every Tesla employee as if they would otherwise have been unemployed and made no allowance for increased government spending to serve the influx of thousands of local residents. The state estimated the factory would create a tax base of $1.9 billion over 20 years. The regional impact is estimated to be $3.5 billion per year. Other large companies chose to create activity in the area partly due to Gigafactory. Tesla agreed to pay $7.5M per year for 5 years ($37.5M) to the school system.

==== Logistics ====
The 6-mile Nevada State Route 439/USA Parkway was built by TRIC, and connects TRIC to Interstate 80. Since 2004, the TRIC owners had planned to extend SR 439 south to U.S. Route 50. In 2014, Nevada Department of Transportation advanced the otherwise dormant south extension. This improves traffic conditions for the many large logistics centres at TRIC and Gigafactory, bypassing Reno on the way to U.S. Route 50. In 2016, Tesla planned to ship batteries by rail to its car factory in Fremont, but rail tracks at Fremont were removed. A 2.5 mile rail right-of-way exists and could be built at a cost of $5 million. Tesla sends 52 truck loads of auto parts per night from GF1 to Fremont (18,200 loads per year).

Water is scarce in Nevada, and some of the water for the Gigafactory is piped from a treatment plant in neighboring Washoe County. A 1.5 million U.S. gallons (5.7 million L) water tank is also used (about two Olympic-size swimming pools).

TRIC built high-pressure natural gas lines to its sites, but Tesla decided to use electricity and not connect natural gas to Gigafactory. Heat pump technology is used for heating, and a $6.8 million hot water storage tank with 10 million gallons is used to balance heat. In 2014 Navigant estimated 100 MW electricity delivery which could be supplied (on average) by nearby wind turbines and roof solar panels, whereas a former Tesla logistics manager in 2016 estimated 300 MW to produce 35 GWh of battery capacity per year. Tesla installed solar panels on the roof in early 2018, reaching over 3.2 MW by 2021, with a preliminary goal of 24 MW. If the factory is fully built, solar capacity could eventually reach 70 MW from 200,000 solar panels.

Tesla works with a mining company to extract lithium 200 miles (320 km) to the southeast, at Silver Peak in Esmeralda County. They intend to process the underground brine water industrially over hours rather than the traditional way of letting the water evaporate from ponds over a year.

=== Construction ===
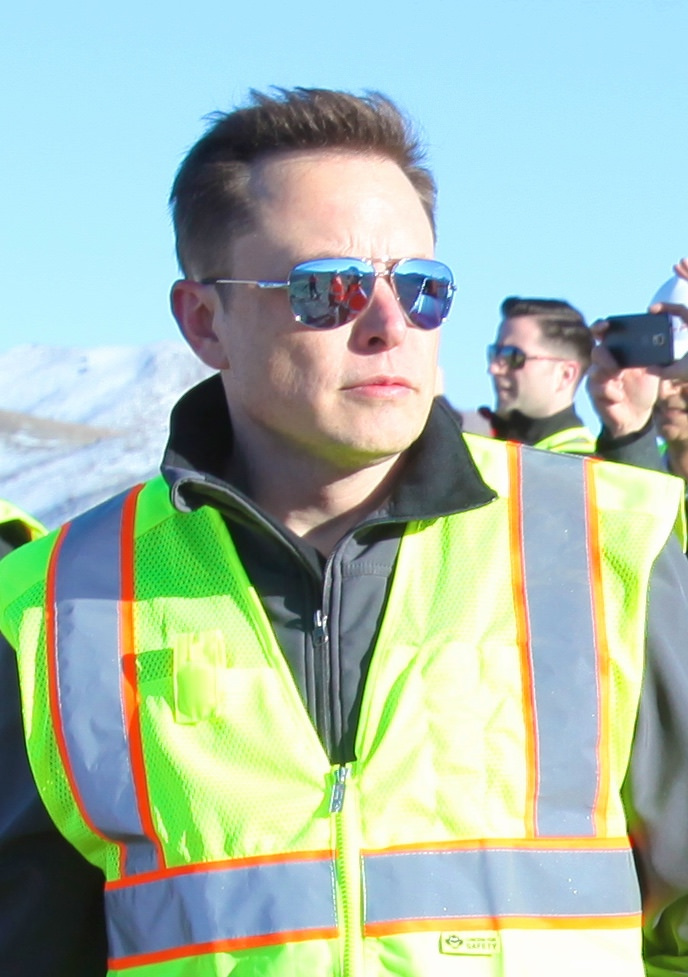
Elon Musk on a March 2015 tour of construction

Tesla had already started brush clearing and grading during the summer of 2014 (prior to official announcement in September; permit date was June 26), with vertical construction reported in January 2015. Tesla and its partners intend to complete the facility by 2018. On March 18, 2016, a group of journalists were allowed to visit the Gigafactory under strict conditions and found that 14% of the final building area had been completed. By April 2016 there were around 600 construction workers. Depending on season and building stage, the number of construction workers has fluctuated between 250 and 1,800. On June 13, 2016, Tesla filed for a $63m expansion into section E on the site. By September 2016, the building had grown to 1.9 million sq ft (0.2 million m^{2}) with further areas under construction. As of January 2017 the building's footprint was 1.9 million sq ft (0.2 million m^{2}) with 4.9 million sq ft (0.5 million m^{2}) of usable area across several floors. A combined permit value of $322m was registered in July 2016, and $1.2b in July 2017. Solar panels were added to the roof, but other than that, there has been no further external construction on the Nevada Gigafactory 1, although Tesla and Panasonic use nearby warehouses.

Gigafactory and the other large companies affect the local area by increased needs in transportation (SR 439) and housing; house prices increased by 17% in 2015 from half of the peak in the previous 2008 building bubble. Local businesses were wary of building new homes, which is being done mostly by out-of-state companies.

Design features

HVAC equipment is located "between the floors rather than on walls and ceilings of a floor." All steel is from the United States. Tesla is its own contractor on the project, learning how to build other factories such as Giga Shanghai, Giga Berlin and Giga Texas.

=== Future expansion ===
On April 30, 2015, Elon Musk announced that the factory heretofore known simply as the Gigafactory was now to be known as Gigafactory 1 as Tesla plans to build more such factories in the future. At the same event, Musk also said that he believed that other companies would build their own similar "Gigafactories". After receiving $800M of orders ($179M PowerWall, $625M PowerPack) within 1 week of unveiling, Musk estimated that the Gigafactory 1 is not enough to supply demand. In May 2017 at a TED Talk, Elon Musk stated his intention to announce three or four new Gigafactory sites to manufacture both batteries and complete cars.

Prior to the building of more gigafactories, Tesla may expand and potentially double the size of Gigafactory 1. In June 2015, Tesla announced it exercised its option to buy 1,864 acres (754 hectares) of land adjacent to the original 1,000-acre (400 ha) Gigafactory site. According to Tesla spokeswoman Alexis Georgeson, "The purchase gives us the opportunity for future growth." In Tesla's dealings with the state of Nevada expanding the size was always an option should the company choose to do so, said Steve Hill, director of the Governor's Office of Economic Development. "Tesla had said that the factory will be up to 10 million square feet [1 million square meters] in one or two stories," Hill said. "On the earnings call (in May 2015), Elon said they aren't yet committing to this but that they are considering increasing the size of the gigafactory here by 50 to 100 percent."

Early estimates from 2014 projected that the factory would employ approximately 6,500 people by 2022, requiring at least half of them to be Nevadans.

=== Expansion for Tesla Semi ===
Tax abatements for Gigafactory expansion starting in 2023:
1. $246M: 10-year personal and property tax abatement (75.0%)
2. $66.6M: Sales tax reduction to 5.35% for 20 years (20.0%)
3. $17.6M: 10-year business tax abatement (5.00%)

Tesla has announced plans to expand Gigafactory Nevada to add a production line for the Tesla Semi and add additional battery manufacturing capacity. The new area will build the company's latest 4680 battery cells. The facility will be capable of building 100 GWh of batteries annually, enough for 1.5 million light duty vehicles. In March 2023, the state of Nevada approved a new package of tax incentives for Tesla worth more than $330 million, in exchange for Tesla investing $3.6 billion over 10 years in the expansion project.

The tax incentive package was structured similarly to the earlier package. Tesla will receive a 10-year full abatement of personal and real property taxes, expected to be worth $246 million. The company will pay a reduced sales tax of 5.35% for 20 years, a savings of $66.6 million, largely on equipment purchase costs. Finally, the automaker will receive a 10-year full abatement of its business tax, saving the company $17.6 million.

== Operations ==
Tesla owns the land and building, and leases parts of the building to several suppliers. The Gigafactory is operated by a management team under executive Jens Peter Clausen, formerly a LEGO executive, who is VP of Gigafactory at Tesla. By April 2016 Gigafactory had 317 Tesla employees and 52 by Panasonic, most of them from Nevada, and 850 by December 2016. In 2017, 3,249 employees were registered, and by December 2018, 7,000 people worked at Giga Nevada, increasing to 7,557 by June 2019, mostly Nevadans.

=== Production ===
The factory is intended to gradually provide cradle-to-cradle handling of batteries, from raw material over components to finished products, and recycling old batteries into new. Cells constitute most of the value creation, whereas packing and electronics are minor parts. Tesla views production as more important than products, and assigns more engineers to developing production equipment than to developing products. On June 5 2024, Gigafactory Nevada produced its 5 millionth drive unit. On July 31 2024, a month later, Gigafactory Nevada produced the 10 millionth Tesla drive unit as counted from all of Tesla's factories. According to the electric car website Teslarati, the two statistics together imply that Tesla makes most of its drive units at Gigafactory Nevada.

==== Cell level ====
Comparison of Tesla's three cylindrical battery cell form factors: the 18650 is built by Panasonic in Japan, the 2170 is currently built by Panasonic at the Gigafactory, and the 4680 is scheduled to be built at the Gigafactory in the future.

Panasonic makes the battery cells at the Gigafactory with the new form factor '2170', jointly designed and engineered by Tesla and Panasonic and subsequently updated. They are larger than the 18650 cells used in the Model S and Model X automobiles. While the new cells were originally expected to be at least 20 mm in diameter and 70 mm in length, revised specifications for the optimized form factor are 21 mm (0.83 in) by 70 mm (2.8 in). Tesla thus refers to it as the '21–70' or '2170' whereas Samsung refers to the size as '21700'.

Panasonic was expected to begin cell production in 2016, and continue for at least 10 years. Among the machines spotted at the opening in July 2016 were presses and rollers for cathodes. Gigafactory began mass production of 2170 cells in January 2017. Only Panasonic cells are to be used in the US-made Model 3, and Tesla uses 21–70 format for Model 3 and Powerwall/Powerpack. Panasonic owns some of the cell production equipment in an area not accessible to non-Panasonic employees. By December 2018, Panasonic operated 11 cell production lines. Some of the lines were temporarily converted from storage (NMC) to vehicle (NCA) to increase supply for the Model 3.

Tesla uses nickel manganese cobalt (NMC) lithium cells for stationary storage (Powerwall and Powerpack), and nickel cobalt aluminium (NCA) lithium cells for vehicles. The cell components are then encased in Nickel-plated steel cans made by Heitkamp & Thumann inside GF1, using 10,000 tons per year. Panasonic delivered three million battery cells daily to Tesla in 2018. An April 2019 report quoting former and current employees at Panasonic's side of the Gigafactory described how half a million of battery cells per day were scrapped because of production defects related to carelessness, lack of respect for operating procedures, and the overall pressure to increase output. At the end of 2019, Panasonic had 3000 US workers and 200 Japanese technicians at Gigafactory 1, and quality had improved to increase production to a rate of 30 GWh/year on the same equipment. Panasonic occupies more than half of the factory, operating 13 cell lines. In early 2021, Panasonic had its first annual profit in Gigafactory. Panasonic operates a warehouse in TRIC, and is making a research&education facility in the city of Reno. By 2022, Panasonic had shipped more than 6 billion cells from Gigafactory.

==== Product level ====
In October 2015, Tesla moved the Tesla Powerwall and Powerpack production from its Fremont factory to the Gigafactory, using 18650 cells. The Tesla Powerwall 1 had been produced in the finished portion since the third quarter of 2015.

For battery packs, 2170-cells are transferred on autonomous vehicles from Panasonic to Tesla, where workers and robots assemble cells into packs using bandoliers, cooled by tubes made onsite by Valeo. Drive units (motor and gearbox) for Model 3 are made with 90% automation.

The Tesla Semi is also assembled at the gigafactory.

=== Output goals ===
As of 2014, the projected capacity of Gigafactory for 2020 was to have been 35 gigawatt-hours per year of cells as well as 50 gigawatt-hours per year (5.7 MW) of battery packs. Production could be equivalent of supplying 500,000 Tesla cars per year. When finished, the factory is planned to produce more lithium-ion batteries in a year than were produced in the entire world in 2013. As of May 2019, Gigafactory 1 has achieved a theoretical capacity of 35 gigawatt-hours per year but utilization levels have resulted in a 24 gigawatt-hour output, according to Panasonic President Kazuhiro Tsuga.

Elon Musk announced at the 2021 Shareholder Meeting that Tesla will aim to increase the production capacity at both Giga Nevada and Fremont Factory by 50% in the next couple of years.

== Legal issues ==
=== Karl Hansen allegations ===
In August 2018, Karl Hansen, a former member of the company's security team, filed a whistleblower complaint with the Securities and Exchange Commission. In the complaint, he alleged that Tesla suppressed an internal investigation into various criminal activities that occurred at Giga Nevada during his tenure, including the alleged theft of $37 million worth of raw materials. He also stated that he submitted corroborating evidence of a connection between "a certain Tesla employee at the time and various alleged members of the Mexican drug cartel identified in the DEA report" that Tesla refused to accept. Separately, Hansen additionally claimed that Tesla installed “specialized router equipment within its Nevada Gigafactory designed to capture employee cell phone communications.” Following the complaint, Hansen went on to allege that Tesla fired him as an employee and then as a contractor because of his investigations.

In 2019, Hansen filed a lawsuit related to these allegations. In 2020, the judged ordered the case to arbitration. In June 2022, the arbitrator filed an unopposed motion with the court stating Hansen "has failed to establish the claims...Accordingly his claims are denied, and he shall take nothing".

=== Refusal to submit to OSHA inspections ===
In 2019, staff at Gigafactory Nevada refused entry to U.S. Occupational Safety and Health Administration who had obtained a search warrant for an inspection.

== See also ==
- List of Tesla factories
