= Solar landfill =

Landfill site converted into a solar power station

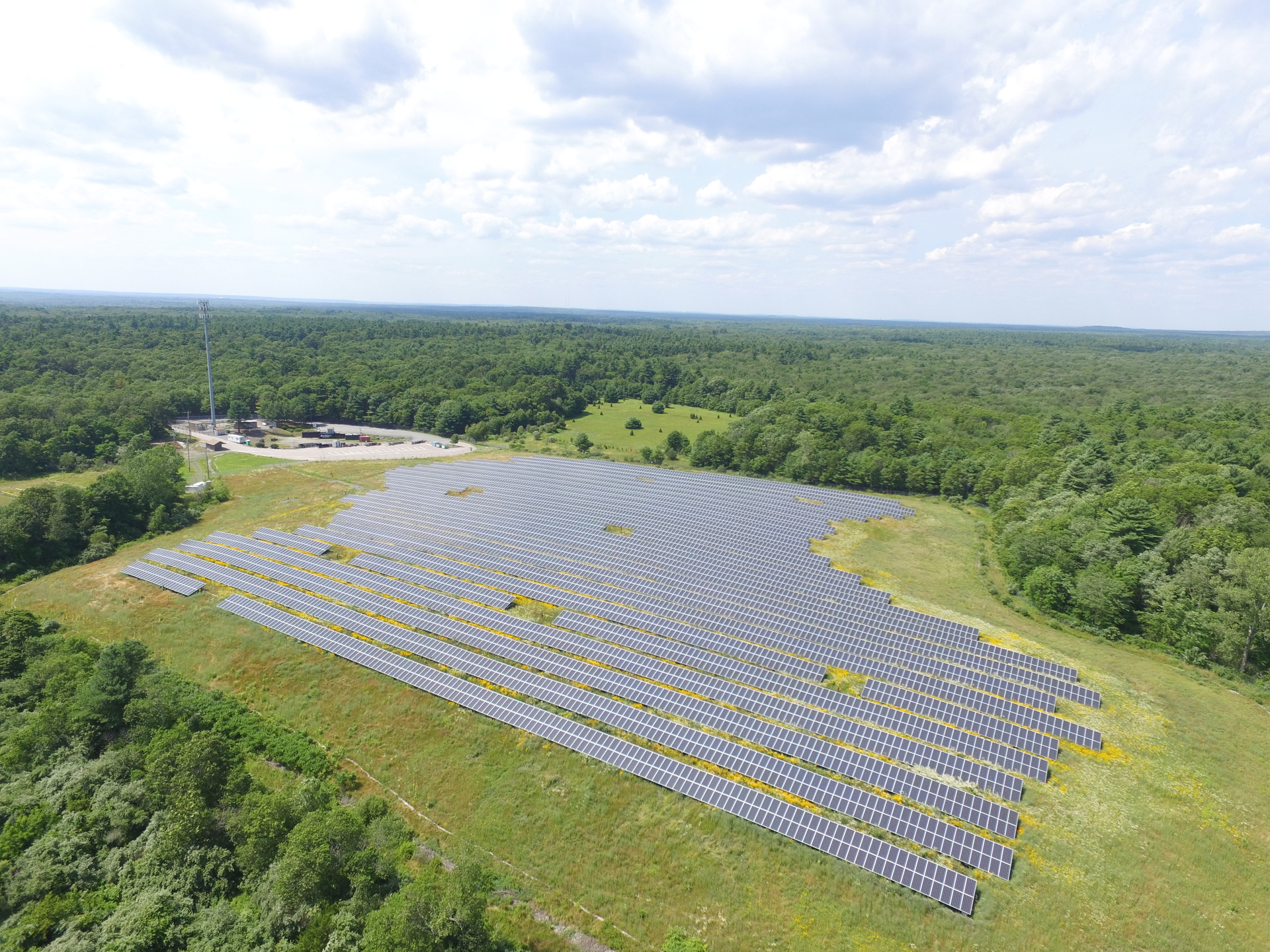
Solar arrays on a full landfill in Rehoboth, MA

A solar landfill, also referred to as a brightfield, is a former landfill site that has been transformed into a solar array or solar farm. Landfills that are no longer in use are often called brownfields due to potential environmental concerns. By repurposing these brownfields into solar fields, they then become brightfields. In the United States, there are more than 10,000 closed or inactive landfills, which have the potential to accommodate over 60 gigawatts of solar installations.

== Development ==
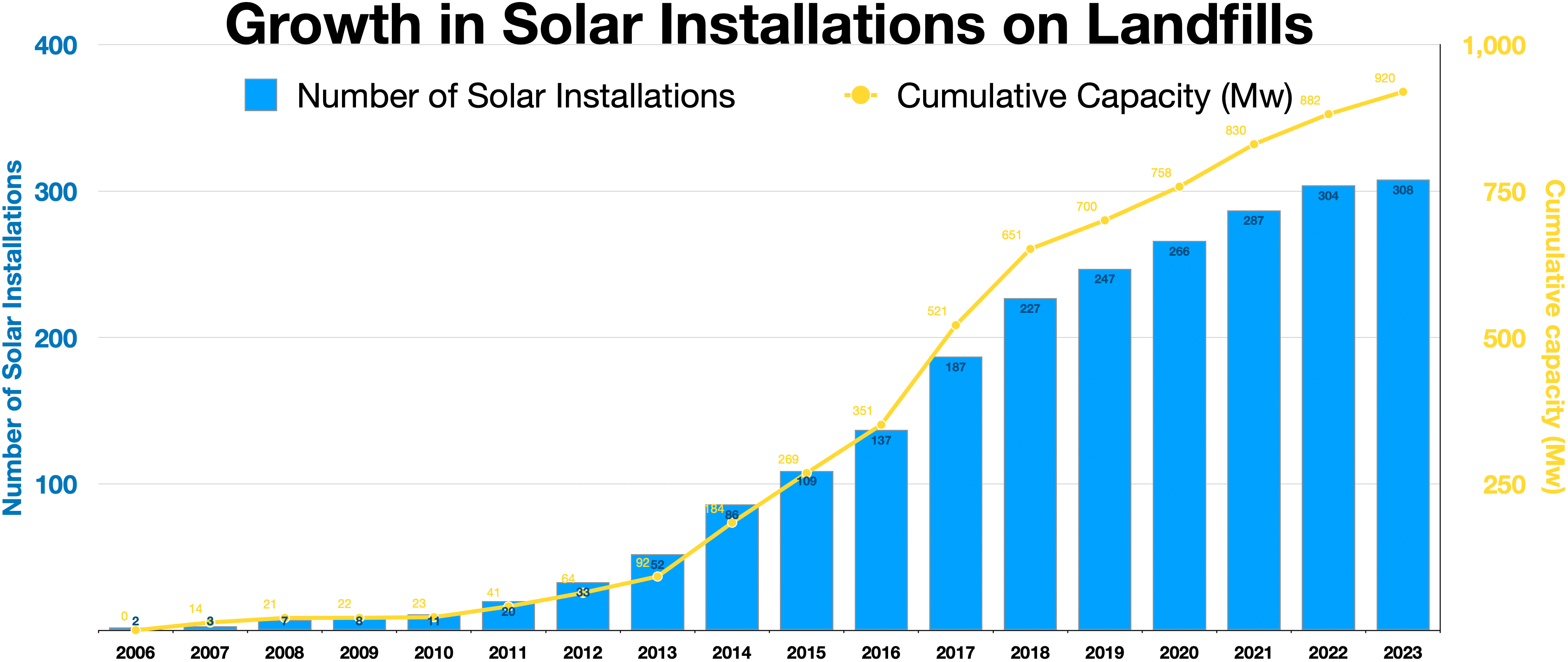
Growth in solar installations on landfills

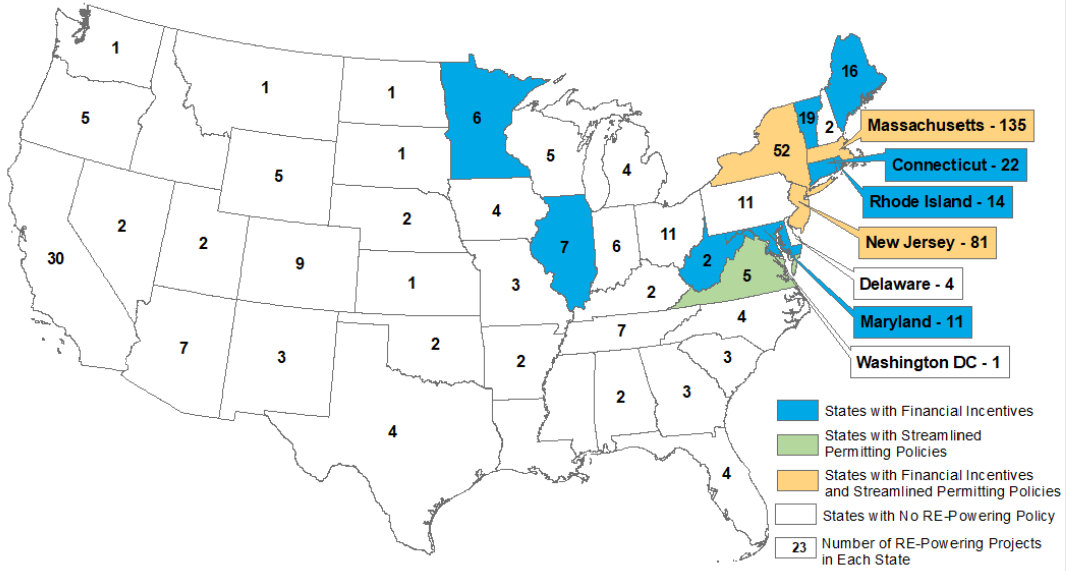
Completed Brownfield renewable projects by US state as of November 2023 States with financial incentives States with streamlined permitting policies States with financial incentives and streamlined permitting policies States with no incentives 5 Number of brownfield completed projects in each State

Landfill sites are often suitable locations for solar farms due to their existing infrastructure, including access roads, electric utilities, and systems for using landfill gas. Additionally, these sites are elevated and devoid of objects that could obstruct solar irradiance. Constructing solar projects on landfills may have the added benefit of not requiring the developer to build on or disrupt existing ecosystems, such as would be the case if the project were to be sited on an area that requires clear-cutting.

In order to be approved to site a solar project on a brownfield, most states require a measure of rehabilitation to be conducted on the land, including the disposal of on-site hazardous materials as well as ecological restoration such as the introduction of native species, improving the resiliency of the land and ensuring that a stable ecosystem is maintained.

The largest solar landfill in the US was completed in Houston, Texas in 2023; a 50 MW solar array was installed on a 240-acre site that was previously an incinerator and landfill decommissioned by the Environmental Protection Agency (EPA) in 1974.

== Environmental impact ==
Solar projects sited on brownfields can help mitigate environmental hazards associated with landfill sites by covering and sealing the waste, preventing further contamination of soil and groundwater, and reducing methane emissions through the capture of landfill gas. By repurposing landfills for solar development, previously unusable land can be reclaimed for a productive purpose, reducing the need for new land development and preserving natural habitats.

Prior to development, landfills may require extensive site preparation, including capping, grading, and soil remediation, to ensure the stability and suitability of the land for solar installation. This work has the added benefit of protecting the surrounding ecosystem from the potentially harmful materials within the landfill.

While solar farms' impact on wildlife remains debated, in many cases, the benefits provided by rehabilitating a landfill in order to site a solar landfill may outweigh the negative effects posed by the existence of a solar farm. Not only does the conversion of landfills into solar farms reduce greenhouse gas emissions and contribute to renewable energy generation, but such development also repurposes previously unusable land and mitigates environmental hazards associated with abandoned landfill sites.

While capping a landfill serves to mitigate exposure to waste products, there are some potential downsides to this process. One issue is that capping the landfill may seal off microbiomes in the soil, which are often home to diverse species of fungi and bacteria that thrive in the landfill environment, potentially leading to biodiversity loss through the partitioning of the two ecosystems.

A potential route to combat biodiversity loss is to utilize the mitigation hierarchy to ensure that proper measures are taken to offset any impacts caused by development.

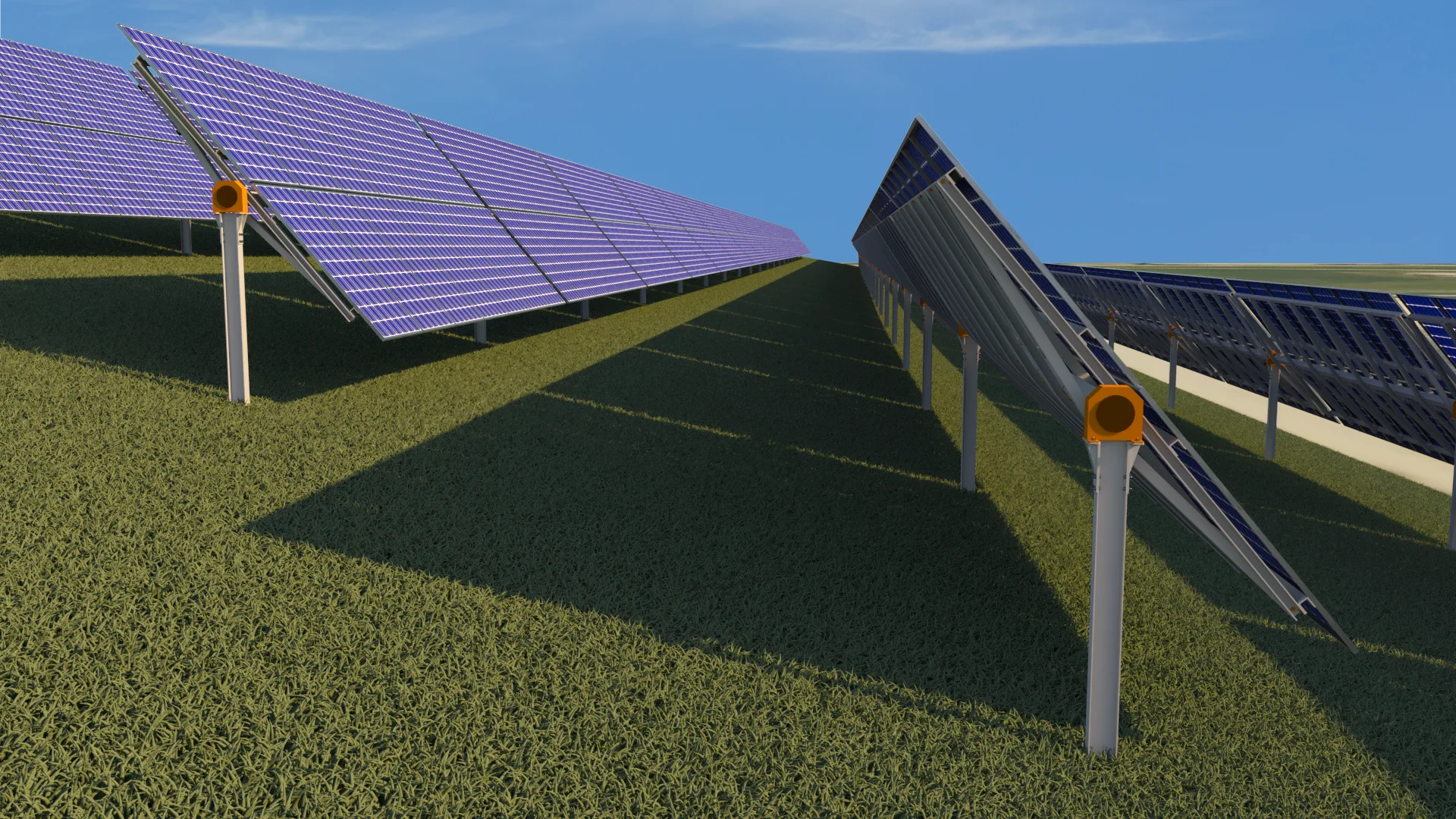
horizontal axis solar trackers 3D sketch

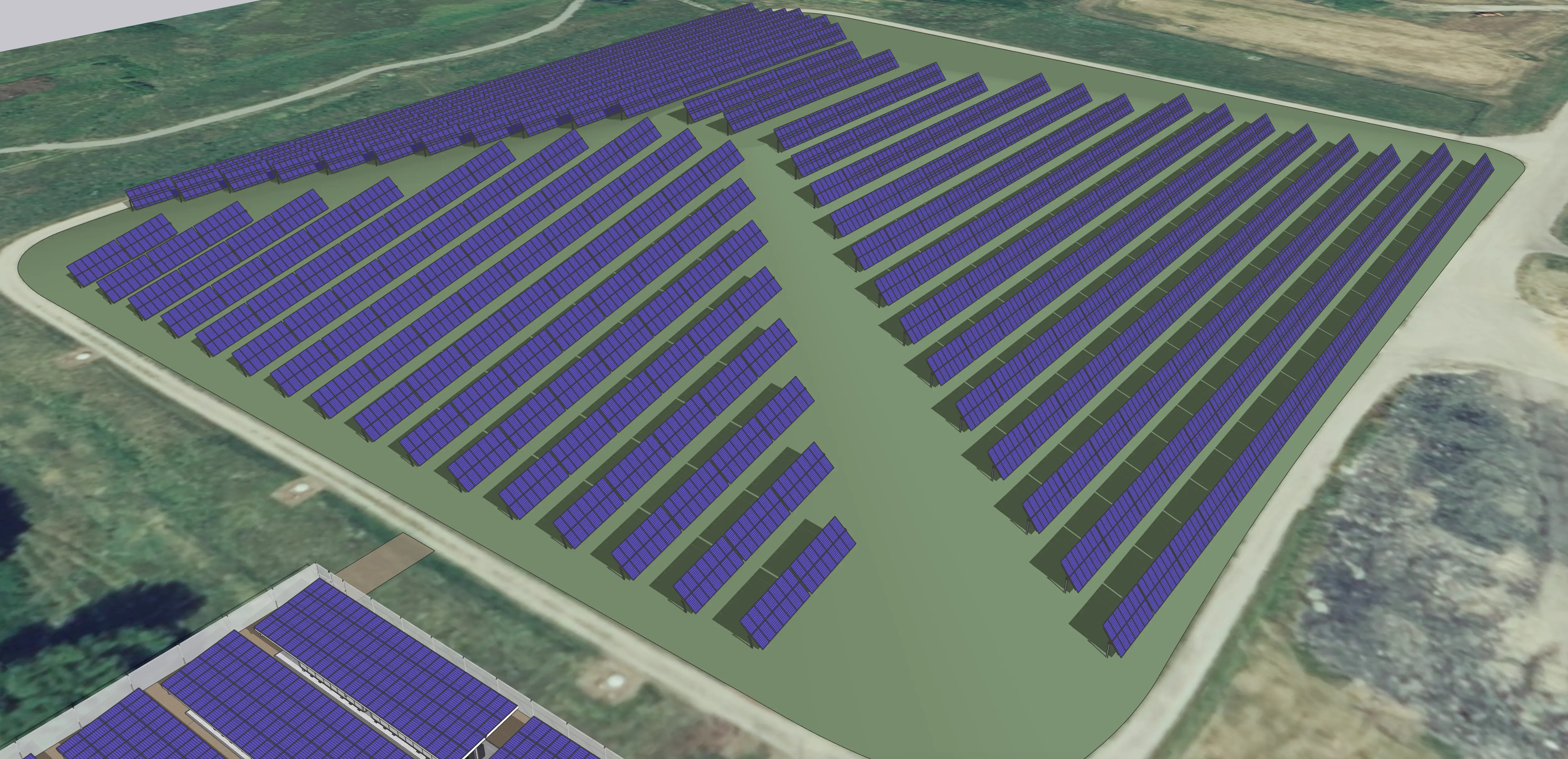
Solar trackers in the morning facing east

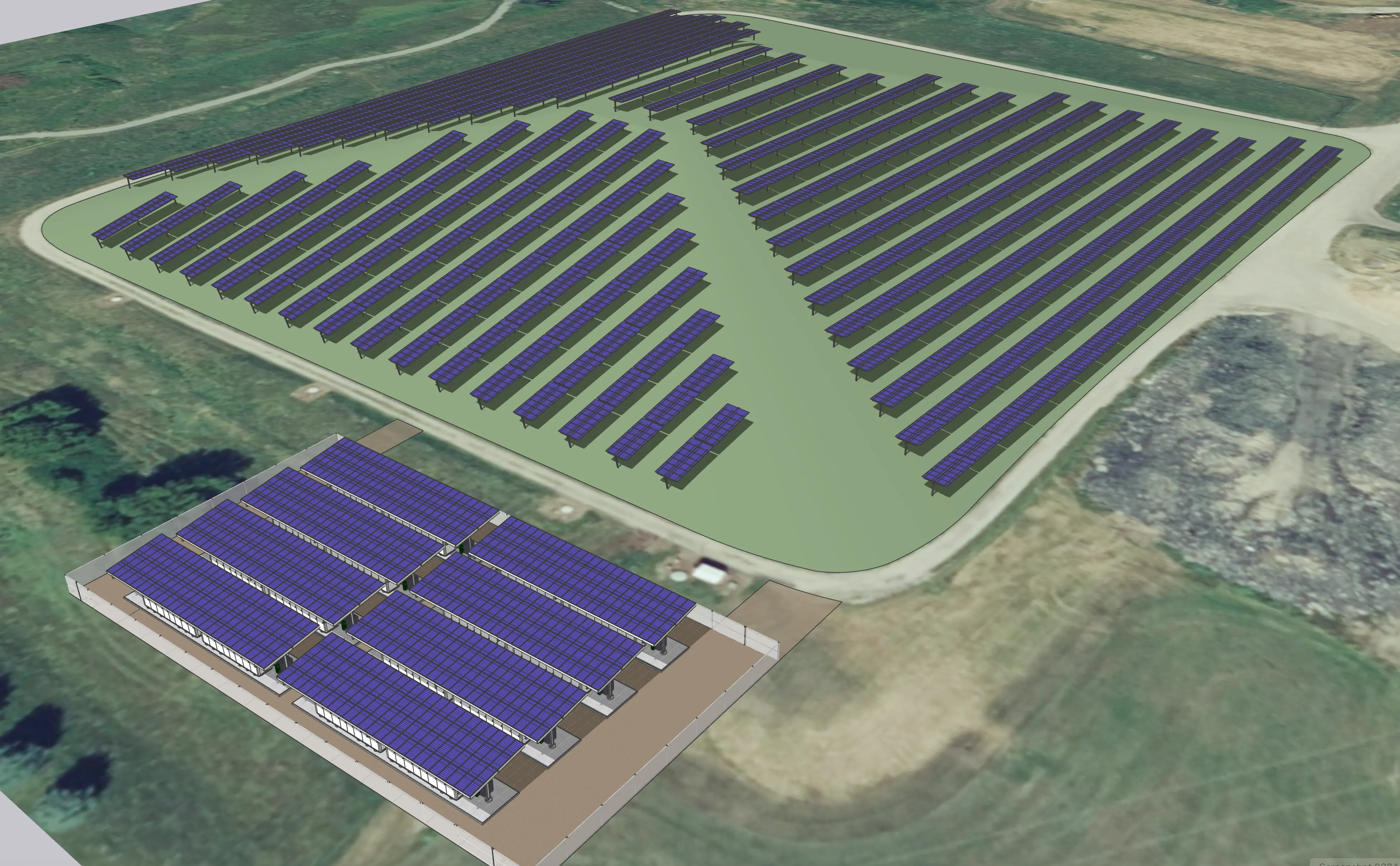
solar trackers at noon laying flat

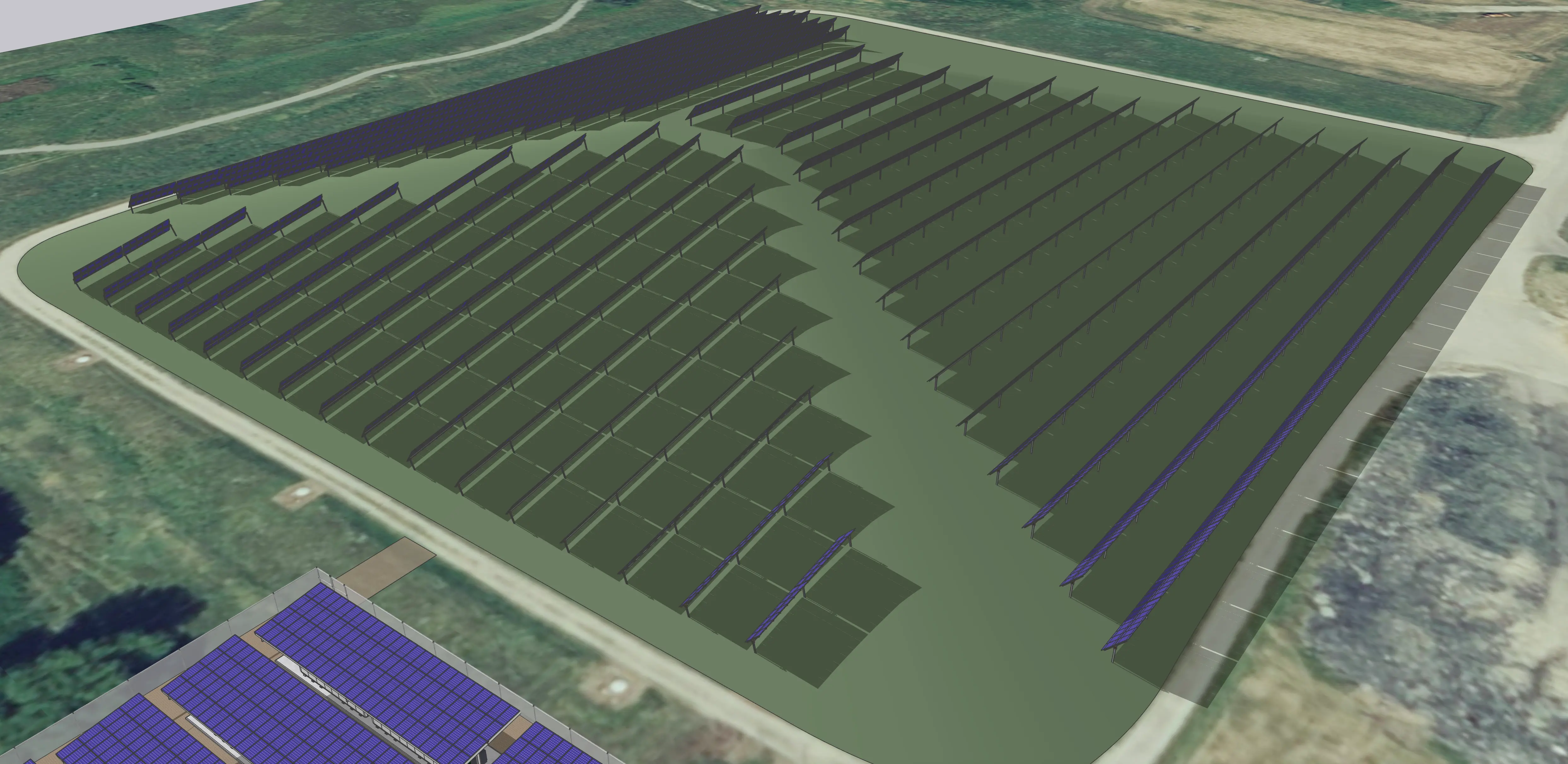
Solar trackers in the evening facing west

3D model of solar landfill with horizontal axis solar trackers, utility scale batteries, and solar canopies; the model shows how the horizontal axis solar trackers track the sun across the sky from morning (east) to evening (west).

== See also ==
- Community solar
- Solar canopy
- Coal ash pond landfill
