= Tesla Roadster (second generation) =

Upcoming electric sports car from Tesla

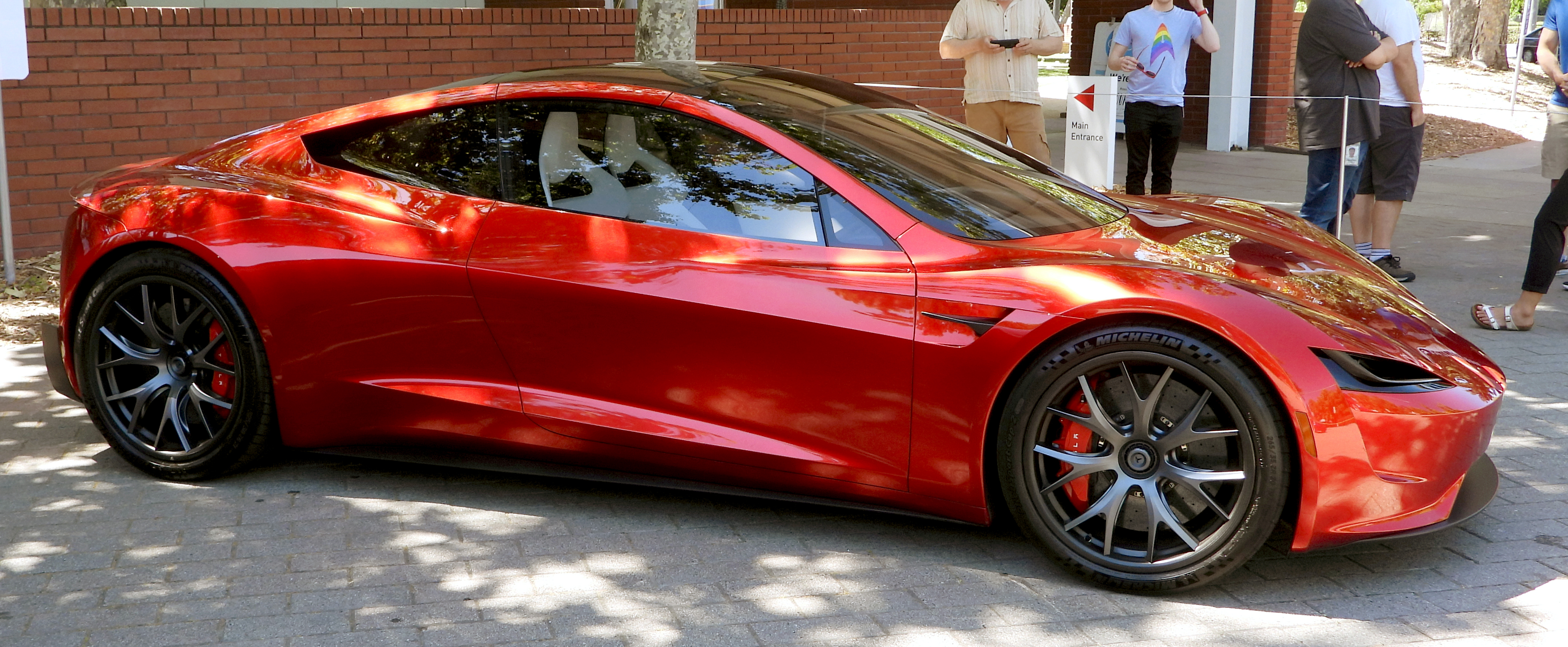
- Second-generation Roadster prototype as originally shown in 2017

Overview
- Manufacturer: Tesla, Inc.
- Production: Yet to commence (planned for 2028)
- Assembly: United States: Texas (planned)
- Designer: Franz von Holzhausen

Body and chassis
- Class: Sports car (S)
- Body style: 2-door coupe
- Layout: Rear-motor, rear-wheel drive
- Doors: Butterfly

Powertrain
- Electric motor: Dual rear motors (one per rear wheel)
- Power output: Over 1,341 hp; 1,360 PS (1,000 kW) (Performance and above)
- Battery: Not disclosed
- Electric range: 310–320 mi (500–510 km) (claimed)
- Plug-in charging: Over 500 kW DC (Supercharger V4)

Dimensions
- Wheelbase: 111.2 in (2,825 mm)
- Width: About 79 in (2,000 mm)
- Curb weight: Under 3,700 lb (1,700 kg) (target)

Chronology
- Predecessor: Tesla Roadster (first generation)

The second-generation Tesla Roadster is an upcoming battery electric sports car under development by Tesla, Inc. When it was announced in November 2017, the company said it would be capable of accelerating from 0 to 60 mph in 1.9 seconds, (Note: Acceleration times: 1.9s: standing start 0–62 miles per hour (0–100 km/h), without rollout allowance.; 1.9s: rolling start ~6–60 miles per hour (10–97 km/h), with 1-foot rollout allowance) which would have been quicker than any street legal production car at the date of its announcement. It is the successor to Tesla's first production car, the 2008 Tesla Roadster, and is intended to be a halo car for the company.

Unveiled as a concept four-seat prototype in 2017, it was originally set to start production in 2020, but was never produced. A redesigned two-seat version was shown in October 2026, with production planned for 2028. Tesla announced three configurations ("Performance", "Thrust", and "Rocket"), the latter two using cold gas thrusters developed with SpaceX; Tesla engineers have also described a base version below the Performance model.

== Overview ==
=== History ===
In 2011, at the end of the production run of the original Tesla Roadster, Musk suggested that a new version of the Roadster, without the Lotus Elise chassis, could return to production by 2014. By 2014, the new Roadster was being reported in the press, sometimes under the name Tesla Model R.

In 2015, Musk suggested a new Roadster as early as 2019, capable of faster acceleration. A tweet by Musk in December 2016 said that a second Roadster was in Tesla's plans, but still "some years away".

A prototype of the Roadster made a surprise appearance at the end of the Tesla Semi event on November 16, 2017, when it was driven out of the back of one of the semi-truck trailers to the song "Sabotage", with a tease of availability in 2020 at a starting price of US$200,000. Musk explained the concept as, "The point of doing this is to give a hardcore smackdown to gasoline cars. Driving a gasoline sports car is going to feel like a steam engine with a side of quiche." Test rides were given at the event for those who put down a $50,000 deposit to pre-order the vehicle.

In June 2018, Musk revealed a potential feature called "SpaceX option package" for the Roadster. This would add around ten cold gas thrusters to the car to improve maneuverability; it would comprise an electric pump to recharge an air tank used to provide compressed air flowing through propelling nozzles to generate a cold jet thrust. The air tanks, based on "composite overwrapped pressure vessel" (COPV) also used in the Falcon 9 rocket, would replace the back seats. The thrusters would be used to improve cornering, acceleration, top speed, and braking. Working pressure would be 10,000 psi (690 bar). On June 27, 2019, Musk tweeted that a "2.1 sec 0-60 mph is base model before adding rocket thruster option". In August 2025, Tesla filed a patent for ground effect technology for the Roadster.

Tesla repeatedly postponed the unveiling of the production Roadster, with dates given from late 2024 to October 2026. Tesla scheduled the reveal near Waco, Texas, for October 1, 2026, but postponed it to October 15 because of severe weather.

On October 15, 2026, Tesla unveiled a redesigned second-generation Roadster at SpaceX's rocket test facility in McGregor, Texas, near Waco. During the demonstration, the driverless vehicle, with a mannequin in a SpaceX spacesuit in the driver's seat, used a combination of high-powered fans/suction systems and cold-gas thrusters (developed in collaboration with SpaceX) to drive up an inverted ramp, perform rotational maneuvers, and briefly launch off the ground and over other Tesla vehicles. Musk called it "the best of the last of the human-driven cars". Tesla announced three configurations—Performance, Thrust and Rocket. At the event, Tesla stated a range of more than 300 mi (480 km) and a top speed above 230 mph (370 km/h); Tesla engineers separately told Top Gear that the initial top speed would be 214 mph (340 km/h), with a 330 mph (530 km/h) version planned. Tesla also reported a 0–60 mph run of 0.81 seconds during the event, which was not independently timed. Musk said production would begin in 2028 but did not announce a price; reservations reopened the same day.

The 2026 vehicle represents a significant departure from the 2017 concept, which had targeted a 1.9-second 0–60 mph time, roughly 620 miles (1,000 km) of range, and production beginning in 2020. Production targets shifted repeatedly between the original announcement and the October 2026 reveal.

=== Production ===
In November 2017, at the Semi unveiling event, Musk announced that the Tesla Roadster production was scheduled to start in 2020.

In July 2020, during the 2020 second quarter earnings call, Musk stated that Tesla plans to tentatively build the Roadster in California and production would be in the next 12 to 18 months, indicating mid to late 2021.

In January 2021, Musk tweeted that production would be delayed until 2022. In a follow-up comment, he said the company would finish engineering the Roadster with the goal of having a "candidate design drivable late summer".

In September 2021, Musk said that production would be delayed until 2023. Musk further confirmed the 2023 production target at the 2021 shareholder meeting in October.

In April 2022, at the Cyber Rodeo opening event for Gigafactory Texas, Musk said Tesla would be in production with the Roadster, the Cybertruck and the Semi in 2023.

At the May 2023 shareholder meeting, Musk said he hoped the engineering and design of the Roadster would be complete by the end of the year, with production starting in 2024. In February 2024, Musk moved the production target to 2025.

At the third quarter earnings call in October 2024, Musk said the Roadster was not a priority for Tesla, but that the company was close to finalizing its design.

In the November 2025 shareholder meeting, Musk said the Roadster production version would be unveiled on April 1, 2026, and that production would begin 12 to 18 months later.

At the October 15, 2026, reveal, Musk said that production would begin in 2028.

=== Pre-order marketing ===
Pre-orders of the Roadster began in 2017, with a $50,000 deposit required. Tesla owners taking part in the referral promotion program began accumulating discounts toward the purchase of a Roadster based on the number of referrals. Those reaching 55 confirmed referrals obtained a 100% rebate toward a future Roadster purchase.

=== Price ===
The base model was initially listed on Tesla's website at $200,000, but the first 1,000 to be produced, known as the Founders Series, would be priced at $250,000. Full payment would be required to pre-order the latter vehicle. The price was later removed from the website, leaving only the deposit/reservation price of the base model as $50,000. When reservations reopened after the October 2026 reveal, Tesla asked for $50,000 to reserve the Performance trim and $250,000 for the Thrust, while the Rocket trim was offered by invitation only. No purchase price was announced.

== Design ==
The 2017 concept was a 2+2 coupé with a removable glass roof.

The 2017 concept had three electric motors (one front, two rear), allowing for all-wheel drive, and torque vectoring during cornering, with a 200 kWh battery and a 620-mile (1,000 km) range at highway speeds. Tesla said the torque at the wheels was 7,400 lb⋅ft (10,000 N⋅m).

A redesigned prototype was shown in 2026. The redesigned car adopts an angular, wedge-shaped exterior language inspired by aerospace engineering, specifically citing the SR-71 Blackbird and F-35 aircraft. Its exterior features hidden headlights, a full-length taillight, flush-mounted aerodynamics, and "Ano White" paint derived from rocket protective coatings, paired with gold-tinted windows designed to mimic Apollo-era spacesuit visors. The cabin includes a fixed seating position with two seats molded into the car (alongside a single-seat "Rocket" trim option), a yoke-style steering wheel for its steer-by-wire system, and lightweight materials such as magnesium, titanium, and carbon fiber. Aerodynamic performance is managed by an active, multi-mode rear wing and a floor-mounted fan/suction system capable of generating downforce or low-speed traction. It has removable T-top roof panels and butterfly doors, and a wheelbase of 2,825 mm (111.2 in).

== Performance ==
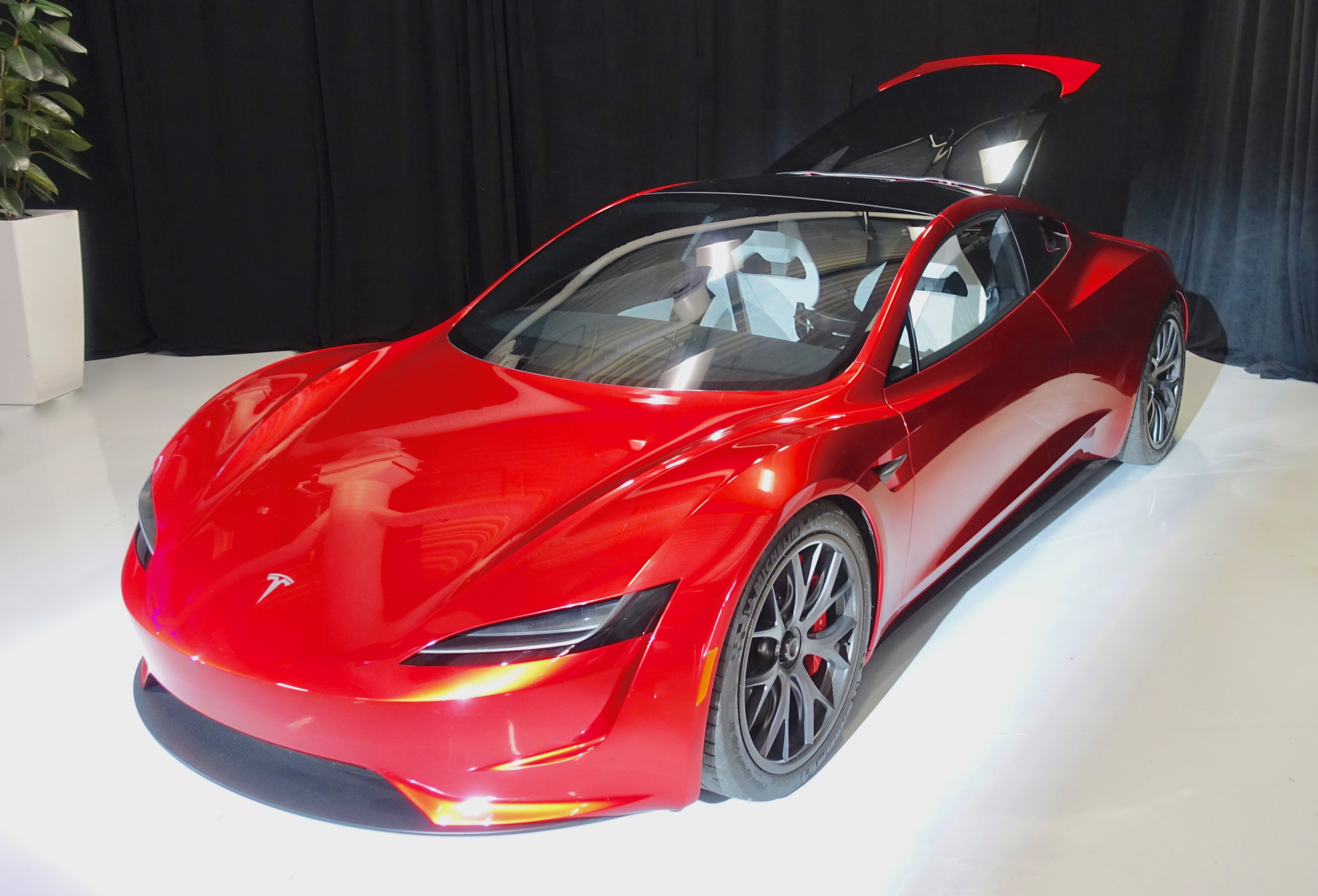
Original second-generation Tesla Roadster prototype (2019)

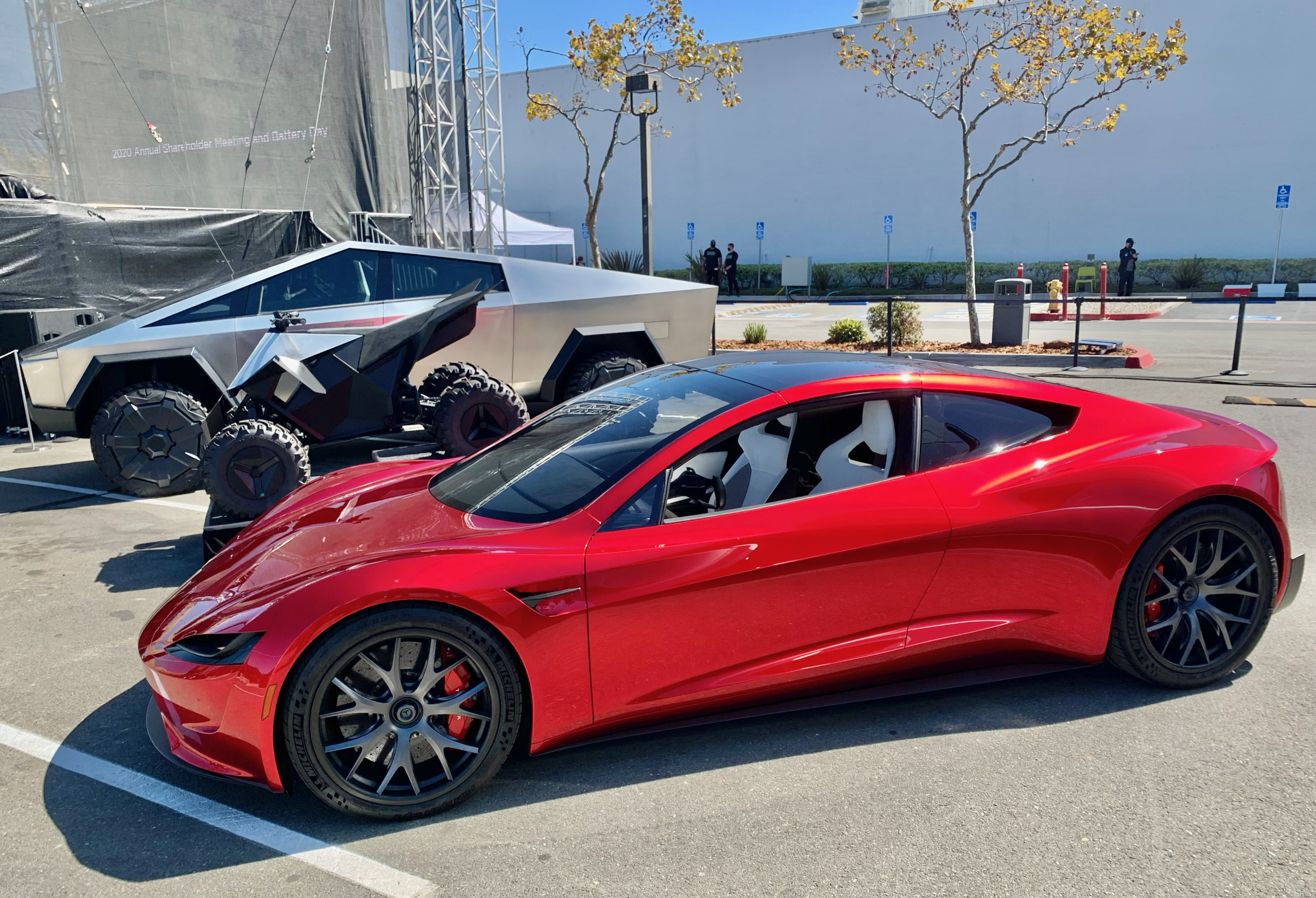
Original second-generation Tesla Roadster prototype (2020)

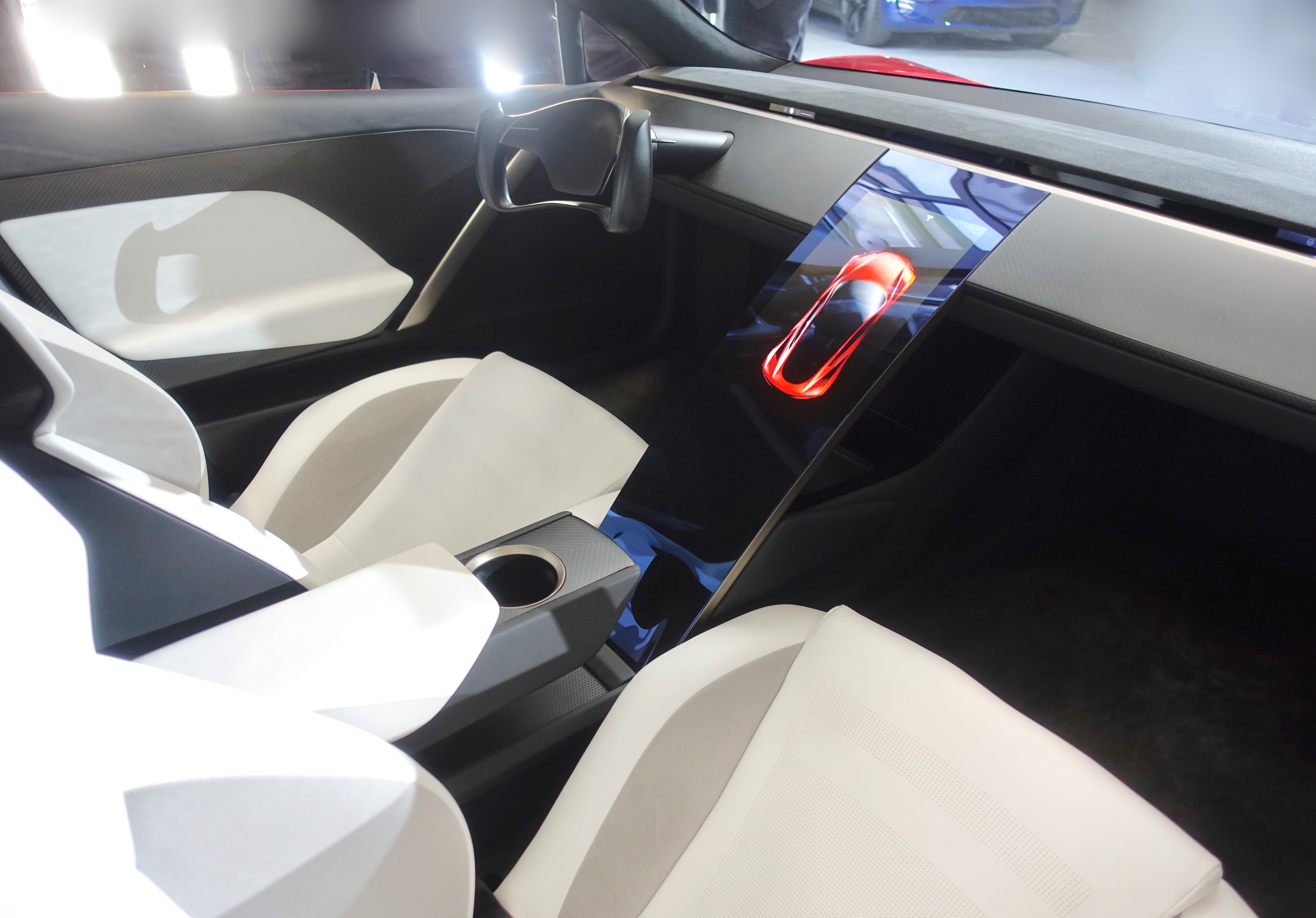
Original second-generation Tesla Roadster prototype (2020) interior

Musk made the following statements in 2019 and 2021 regarding the prototype Roadster's acceleration:

- 0–60 mph (0–97 km/h) in 1.1 seconds with a rocket thruster option added (without specifying if this includes a 1-foot rollout).
- 0–60 mph (0–97 km/h) in 2.1 seconds for the base model before adding rocket thruster option (without specifying if this includes a 1-foot rollout). Tesla's website later stated 1.9 seconds.

At the 2017 unveiling, Tesla stated a 0 to 1/4 mile (0 to 400 metres) time of 8.8 seconds and a top speed above 250 mph (400 km/h). Musk said it would be the first production car to run the quarter mile in under nine seconds, adding, "this is what we are achieving in the prototype"; he also indicated that the stated numbers refer to the anticipated "base model".

In February 2024, Musk stated on X that the new design goal for the production Roadster included an acceleration of 0–60 mph (0–97 km/h) in less than one second, without specifying if the "SpaceX package" would be an option or not.

The redesign unveiled in October 2026 has three performance configurations: a Performance variant; a race-ready Thrust variant featuring four rear-mounted cold-gas thrusters, said to reach 0–60 mph in under 0.9 seconds; and the invite-only, single-seat Rocket variant equipped with ten perimeter cold-gas thrusters, reducing it to under 0.59 seconds. Tesla said the Rocket variant would be for off-road use only. All three announced variants incorporate an active fan-suction system to generate downforce, and Tesla said the car could corner at more than 2 g.

In a walkaround interview with Top Gear recorded before the reveal, Tesla executives described a fourth, base version below the Performance, and said every version would be rear-wheel drive, with two motors on the rear axle providing torque vectoring, rather than the three-motor, all-wheel-drive layout announced in 2017. They said the car would produce more than 1,000 kW from an 800–1,000-volt battery using cells developed specifically for the car, with a target weight under 1,700 kg (3,700 lb), a range of about 310–320 mi (500–510 km), and charging at more than 500 kW. The Thrust version stores nitrogen in a 200 L (53 US gal) composite overwrapped pressure vessel at about 10,000 psi (690 bar), which takes up the trunk and feeds four rear nozzles. One fill provides a single use of about five seconds, enough for a 0–60 mph run of about 0.85 seconds, and refilling currently takes two to six hours. The Rocket adds six more thrusters at the front and sides, and replaces the passenger seat with a further 400 L (110 US gal) tank, for 600 L (160 US gal) in total.

== Analysis ==
A November 2017 Bloomberg News article reported that the estimate as to the range per charge is optimistic, based on comments from Salim Morsy, the electric vehicle analyst at Bloomberg New Energy Finance. In an article titled Tesla's Newest Promises Break the Laws of Batteries, Morsy indicated that the reported battery capacity would require batteries that would be too large for the Roadster's small frame. "I don't think the car you saw last week had the full 200 kilowatt hours in it. I don't think it's physically possible to do that right now."

Venkat Viswanathan, then an assistant professor of mechanical engineering at Carnegie Mellon University, told Jalopnik that the 1.9-second figure for 0–60 mph (0–97 km/h) seemed reasonable. Using his team's assumption of 240 Wh per kilogram, he estimated that the claimed 200 kWh pack would weigh about 1,836 pounds (833 kg), and said the acceleration and top speed claims depended on tires that could provide enough grip.

== In media ==
In an episode of Jay Leno's Garage broadcast on August 23, 2018, Jay Leno rode in the Roadster prototype with Tesla's chief designer, Franz von Holzhausen.

In a March 2024 interview with Don Lemon, Musk stated that the Roadster would "not have big wings", but would have a drive-by-wire steering yoke.
