= 0 to 60 mph =

Automotive acceleration performance metric

The time it takes a vehicle to accelerate from 0 to 60 miles per hour (97 km/h or 27 m/s), often said as just "zero to sixty" or "nought to sixty", is a commonly used performance measure for automotive acceleration in the United States and the United Kingdom. In the rest of the world, 0 to 100 km/h (0 to 62.1 mph) is used.

Present production model performance cars are often capable of going from 0 to 60 mph in under 5 seconds, while some sports cars and electric vehicles can do 0 to 60 mph in between 2 and 3 seconds. Motorcycles have been able to achieve these figures with sub-500cc since the 1990s. The fastest automobile in 2015 was the Porsche 918 Spyder, which is a hybrid vehicle that takes 2.2 seconds to accelerate from 0 to 60 mph. In June 2021, the Tesla Model S Plaid was measured to accelerate from 0 to 60 mph in 1.98 seconds, not including the first foot of rollout. In October 2026, Tesla unveiled an updated prototype demonstration of its long-delayed second-generation Tesla Roadster. Equipped with optional rear-firing compressed-air thrusters developed in collaboration with SpaceX and an underbody suction system, Tesla claimed a 0–60 mph (0–97 km/h) acceleration time of 0.81 seconds. If replicated in production form, this would make it the fastest-accelerating road-legal production car.

== History ==
The invention and popularization of 0 to 60 mph times as a metric for measuring a car's performance has been credited by some sources to automotive writer Tom McCahill, who started publishing 0-60 mph times in 1946 while writing for the magazine Mechanix Illustrated.

== Methods ==
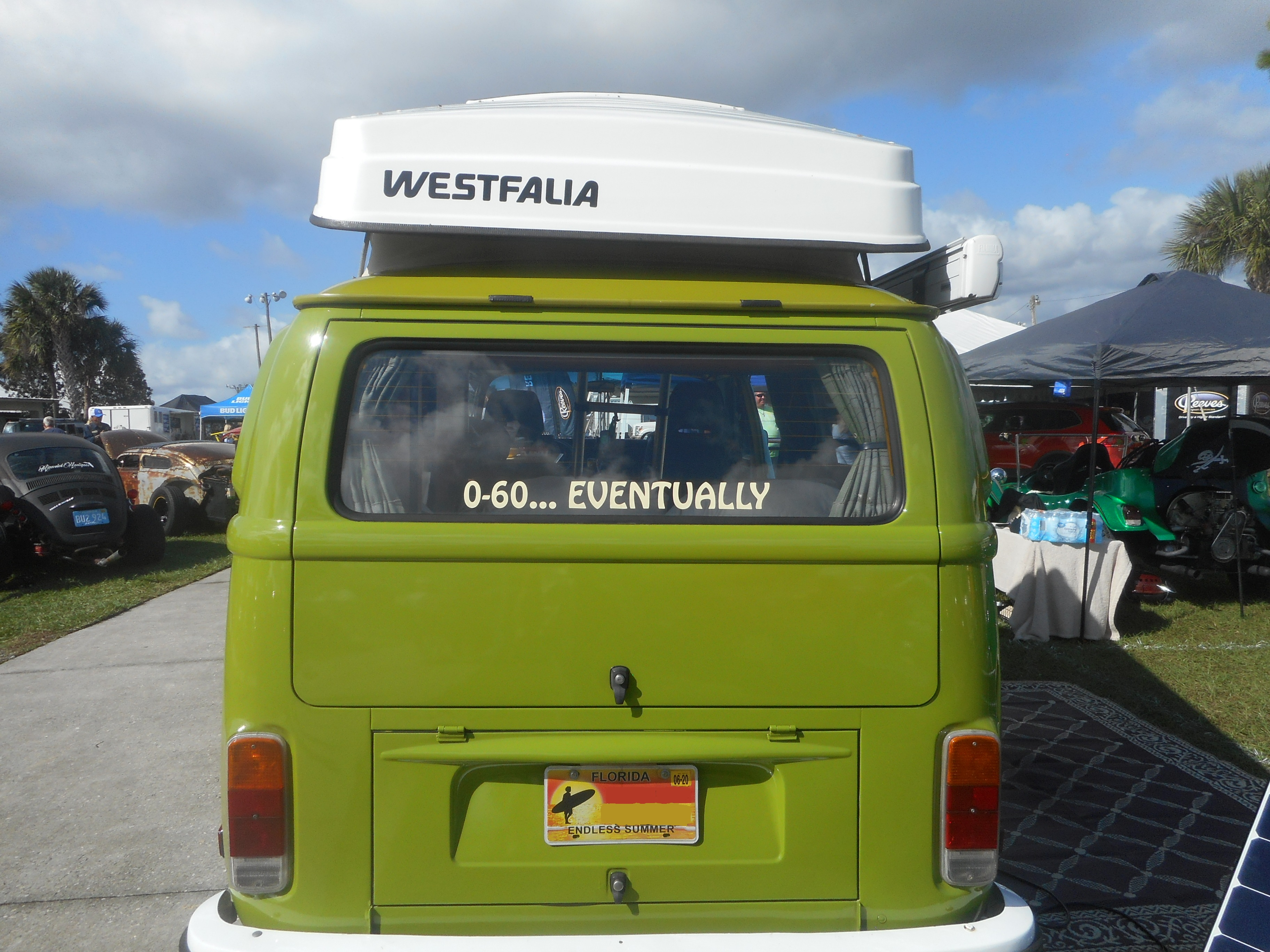
Satirical sign on a Volkswagen Westfalia Camper noting that it will make 0 to 60 "eventually."

Measuring the 0 to 60 mph speed of vehicles is usually done in a closed setting such as a race car track or closed lot used for professional drivers. This is done to reduce risk to the drivers, their teams, and the public. The closed course is set up for test-drives in order to reduce any variables, such as wind, weather, and traction. Each variable can have a dramatic impact on the friction of the track and the drag placed on the vehicle, which will influence the overall 0 to 60 time that is recorded.

The crew sets up accurate and precise measuring tools that are attached to computers. These tools included Doppler radar guns and precise timing instruments that are synchronized. This means that the driver is not worried about keeping time or the exact moment the car hits 60 miles per hour. The driver focuses solely on driving straight and fast with professional quick gear shifting.

The car is timed and recorded going in two separate and opposite directions. This practice eliminates variables such as wind, directional traction of the track and driver performance. The two times are averaged together to achieve the commonly accepted 0 to 60 time.

Jalopnik has said that launch control systems appearing on production exotic cars in the 2010s have made published 0 to 60 times invalid, since these cars have slower times from 5 mph to 60 mph.

Some car magazines and manufacturers in the United States use a rolling start allowance term "1-foot rollout", which means that the timer is only started once the car has traveled 11.5 inches (30 cm), reducing the measured time by up to 0.3 seconds.

== See also ==
- List of fastest production cars by acceleration
- List of fastest production motorcycles by acceleration
- Vehicular metrics
- Motorcycle testing and measurement
