= Chevrolet Corvette (C8) =

Eighth generation of the Corvette sports car

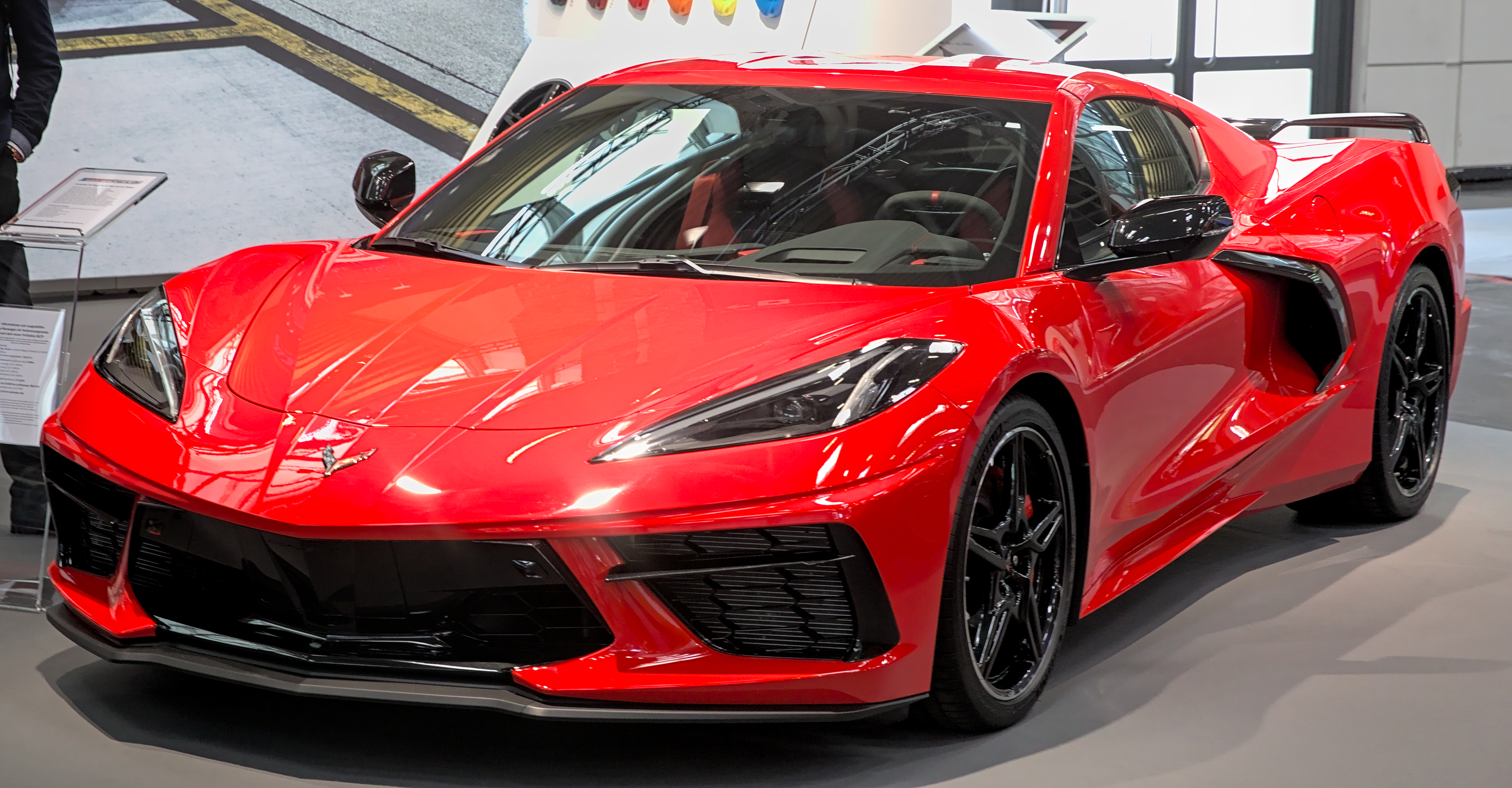
- Chevrolet Corvette (C8) Stingray

Overview
- Manufacturer: Chevrolet (General Motors)
- Also called: GMSV Chevrolet Corvette (Australia)
- Production: February 2020–present
- Model years: 2020–present
- Assembly: United States: Bowling Green, Kentucky (Bowling Green Assembly Plant)
- Designer: Tom Peters (2015)

Body and chassis
- Class: Sports car (S)
- Body style: 2-door targa top coupe; 2-door retractable hardtop convertible
- Layout: Rear mid-engine, rear-wheel-drive Rear mid-engine, four-wheel-drive (E-Ray, Grand Sport X, and ZR1X)
- Platform: General Motors Y2XX

Powertrain
- Engine: 6.2 L LT2 crossplane OHV V8 (2020–2026); 6.7 L LS6 crossplane OHV V8 (2027–); 5.5 L LT6 flat-plane DOHC V8; 5.5 L LT7 twin-turbo flat-plane DOHC V8
- Electric motor: 1x Permanent magnet synchronous motor (E-Ray, Grand Sport X and ZR1X)
- Power output: 490–495 hp (365–369 kW; 497–502 PS) (2020-2026 Stingray); 535 hp (399 kW; 542 PS) (2027+ Stingray/Grand Sport); 655 hp (488 kW; 664 PS) (E-Ray, combined); 670 hp (500 kW; 679 PS) (Z06); 721 hp (538 kW; 731 PS) (Grand Sport X, combined); 1,064 hp (793 kW; 1,079 PS) (ZR1); 1,250 hp (932 kW; 1,267 PS) (ZR1X)
- Transmission: Tremec TR-9080 DCT 8-speed dual clutch transmission
- Hybrid drivetrain: Through the Road Hybrid (E-Ray, Grand Sport X and ZR1X)
- Battery: 1.9 kWh 300 V (E-Ray, Grand Sport X and ZR1X)

Dimensions
- Wheelbase: 107.2 in (2,723 mm)
- Length: 182.3 in (4,630 mm)
- Width: 76.1 in (1,933 mm)
- Height: 48.6 in (1,234 mm)
- Curb weight: 3,647 lb (1,654 kg) Stingray; 3,666 lb (1,663 kg) Z06; 3,831 lb (1,738 kg) ZR1; 3,965 lb (1,798 kg) E-Ray; 4,162 lb (1,888 kg) ZR1X

Chronology
- Predecessor: Chevrolet Corvette (C7)

The Chevrolet Corvette (C8) is the eighth generation of the Corvette sports car manufactured by American automobile manufacturer Chevrolet. It is the first rear mid-engine Corvette, departing from the longstanding front mid-engine design used for the previous seven generations since its introduction in 1953.

Two variants of the C8 would go racing globally. The base model Corvette would serve as the basis for the Chevrolet Corvette C8.R, debuting in July 2019, later going on to win the 2020 and 2021 IMSA SportsCar Championships and the 2023 FIA World Endurance Championship. It would later be succeeded by the Z06-based Chevrolet Corvette Z06 GT3.R in 2024, following the discontinuation of the LM GTE class.

== Development ==
GM and Chevrolet started developing the next-generation (C8) Mid-engine Corvette around 2016. The car was initially planned for the 2018 model year before delaying it to 2019 and 2020.

Chevrolet announced the C8 in April 2019 with teasers showing off the model in a camouflage form.

The 2020 coupe variant made its official debut on July 18, 2019 during a media event at Tustin, California (referencing its association with NASA) to coincide with the 50th anniversary of the Apollo 11 mission, while the 2020 convertible variant made its debut in October 2019.

Production of the C8 was originally planned to begin in late 2019, but it officially began on February 3, 2020, as it was delayed by the 2019 General Motors strike.

== Overview ==
The Corvette C8 is GM's first rear mid-engine sports car since the Pontiac Fiero. It features a vastly different design from previous Corvettes, with an all-new aluminum architecture and coilover springs in place of the rear transverse mono-leaf spring used on previous models. The exterior features more aggressive aerodynamics including larger air intakes and prominent side scoops. A trunk is located at the rear, with additional storage space at the front of the car. Combined, these provide 13 cubic feet (370 L) of cargo space, 2 cubic feet (57 L) less than that of the C7. As a result of the switch to a mid-engine layout, the passenger cell has been shifted forward by 16.5 inches (420 mm). The cockpit has been designed to be driver-centric, with numerous controls mounted on the center console as well as utilizing a new hexagonal steering wheel. A 12 in (30.5 cm) digital screen replaces the instrument cluster and reflects one of the six selected driving modes, and is accompanied by an 8 in (20.3 cm) touchscreen. A special Z button is located on the steering wheel; named in honor of earlier performance packages like Z51, Z06, and ZR1, it allows the driver to quickly activate customized performance settings.

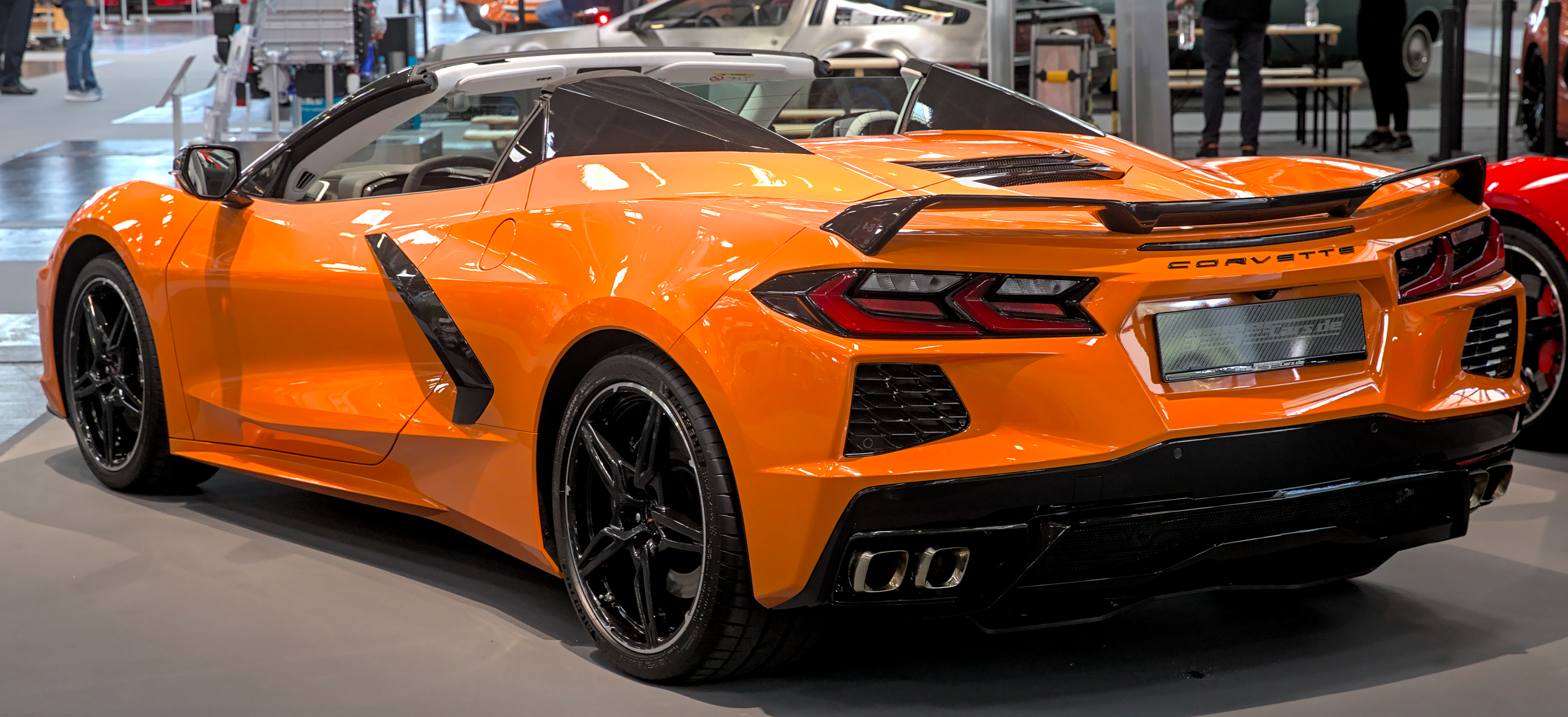
Corvette C8 Convertible

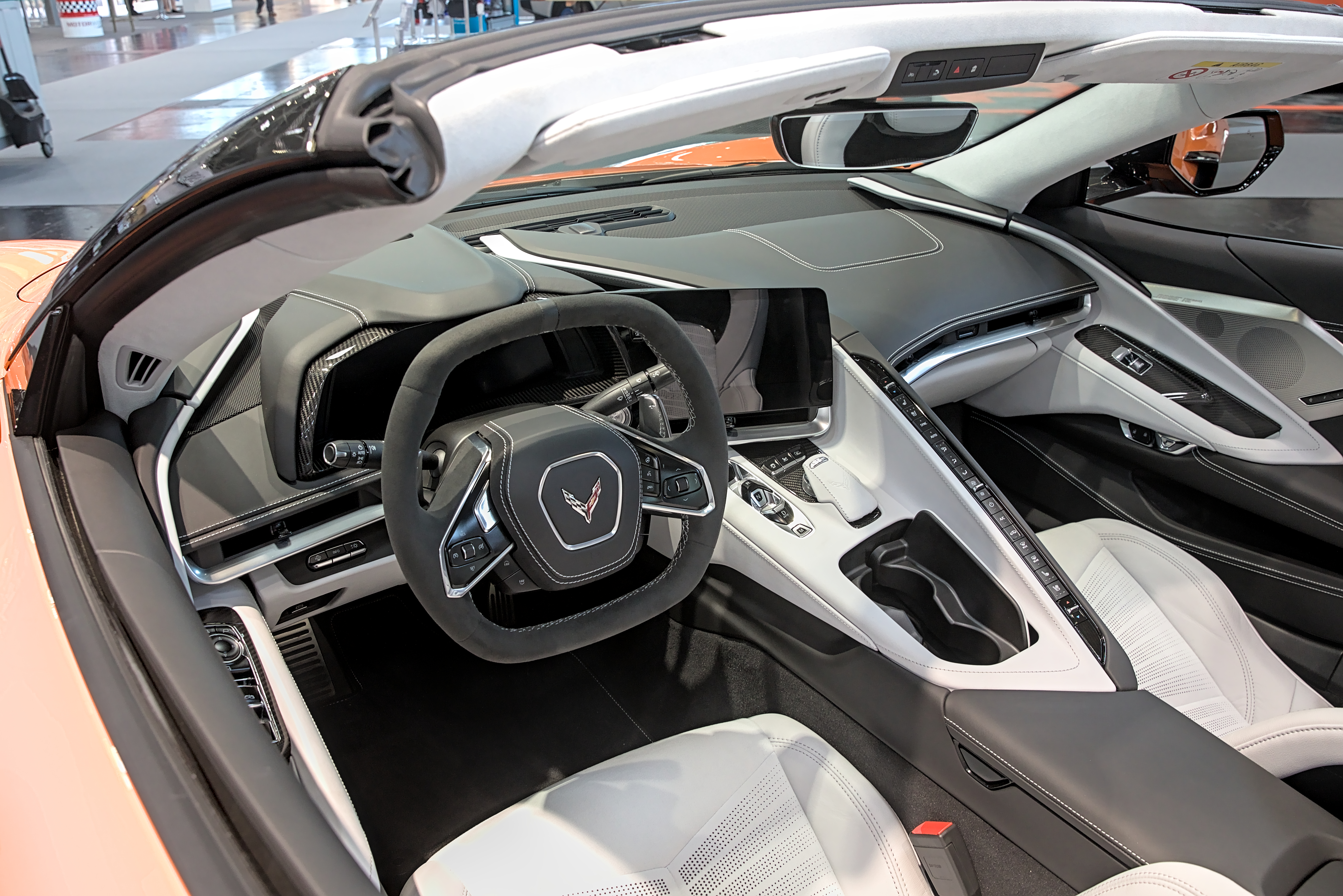
Interior

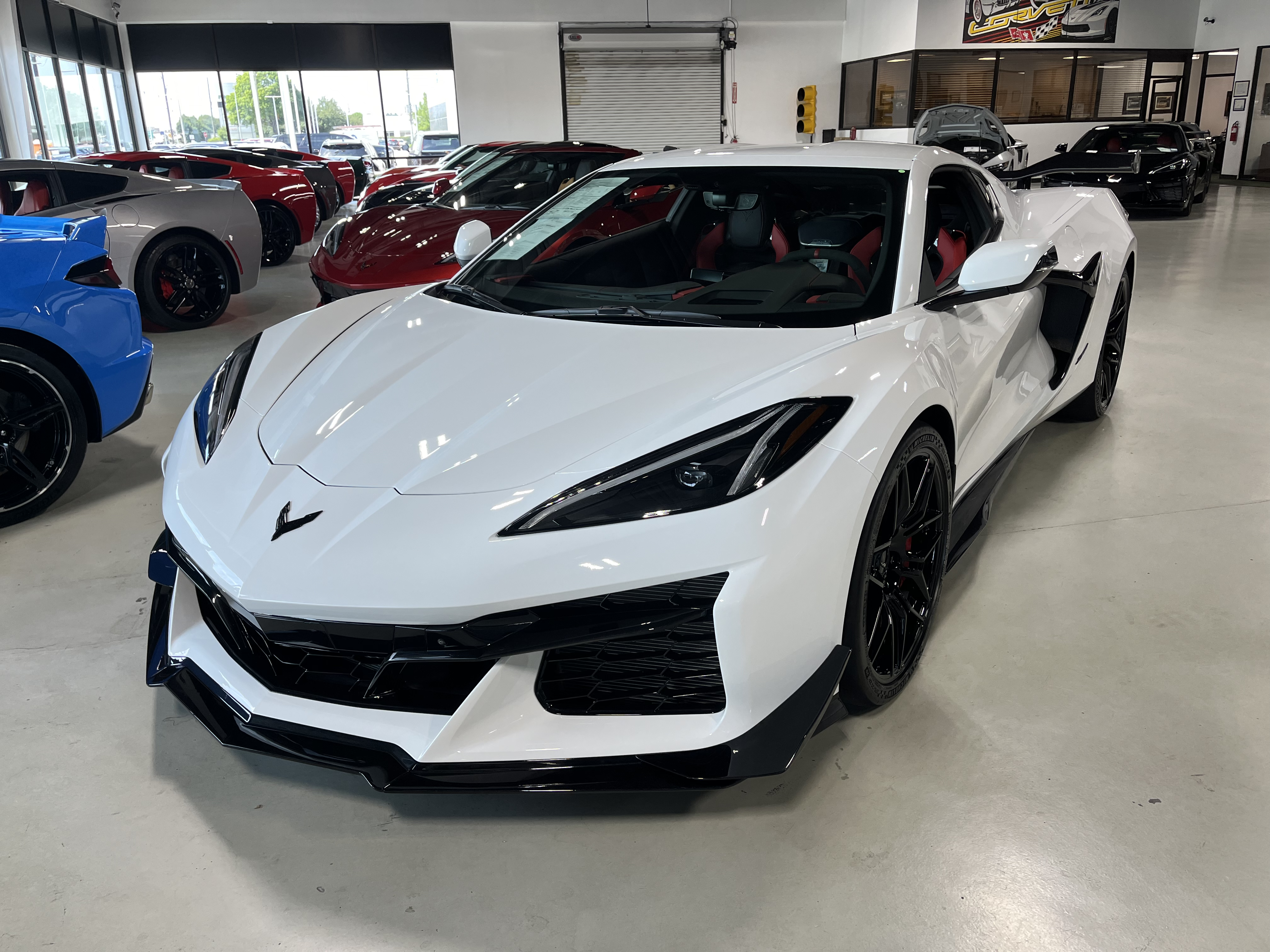
C8 Z06 with Z07 option

== Stingray ==
=== Trim levels and options ===
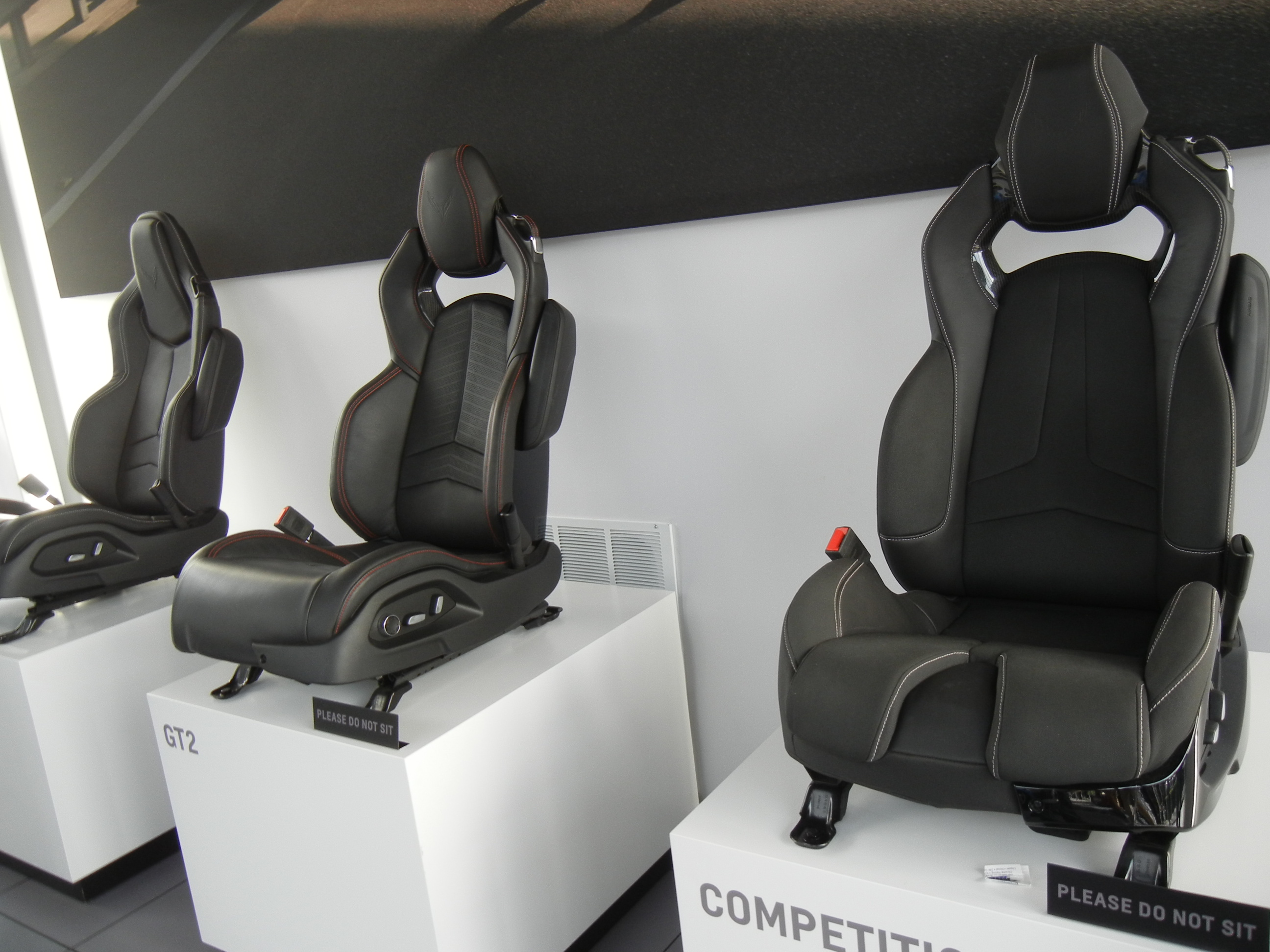
GT1, GT2, Competition Sport seat options

Three trim levels are currently available, 1LT, 2LT and 3LT, augmented by three suspension setups, FE1, FE3 and FE4 which correspond with the two Z51 Performance packages. In addition, three seat options are also available: GT1, GT2 and Competition Sport. The interior is upholstered in leather, Microsuede or performance textile with carbon fiber or aluminum trims. A Performance Data Recorder has been upgraded with a higher resolution camera as well as a new interface. GM's virtual camera mirror is optional, which projects video from the backup camera onto the rear-view mirror.

=== Engine ===
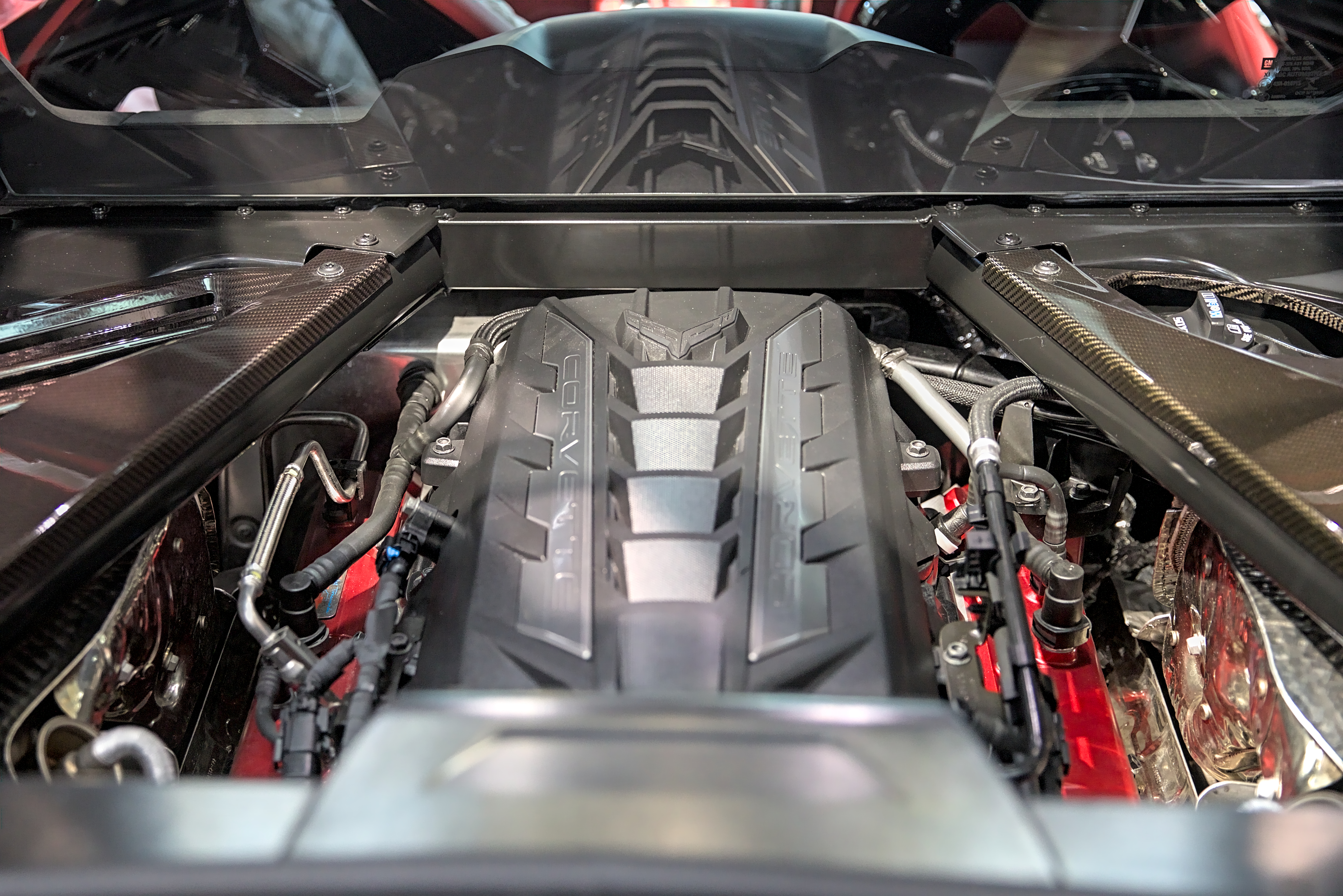
The LT2 V8 engine

The Stingray uses a new version of the LS-based GM small-block engine derived from the C7 Stingray's LT1, now called the LT2. The new naturally aspirated 6.2 L OHV V8 with crossplane crankshaft is rated at 490 hp (365 kW; 497 PS) at 6,450 rpm and 465 lb⋅ft (630 N⋅m) of torque at 5,150 rpm, an improvement of 40 hp (30 kW; 41 PS) and 10 lb⋅ft (14 N⋅m) over the outgoing LT1. The engine uses a dry sump lubrication system. Like the LT1, the LT2 features Active Fuel Management, or cylinder deactivation, which is used when the car is subjected to low load scenarios such as highway cruising.

The engine has two radiators, one on each side in the front. The Z51 package includes a third radiator, a water-to-water and water-to-oil radiator on the rear driver's side, cooling both engine oil and transmission lubricant, taking air in through the rear quarter panel opening.

The optional NPP sport exhaust system brings the total power output to 495 hp (369 kW; 502 PS) and torque to 470 lb⋅ft (637 N⋅m). Chevrolet says that the C8 can accelerate to 60 mph (97 km/h) in 2.9 seconds when equipped with the optional Z51 package; Car and Driver recorded an adjusted time of 2.8 seconds.

=== Transmission ===
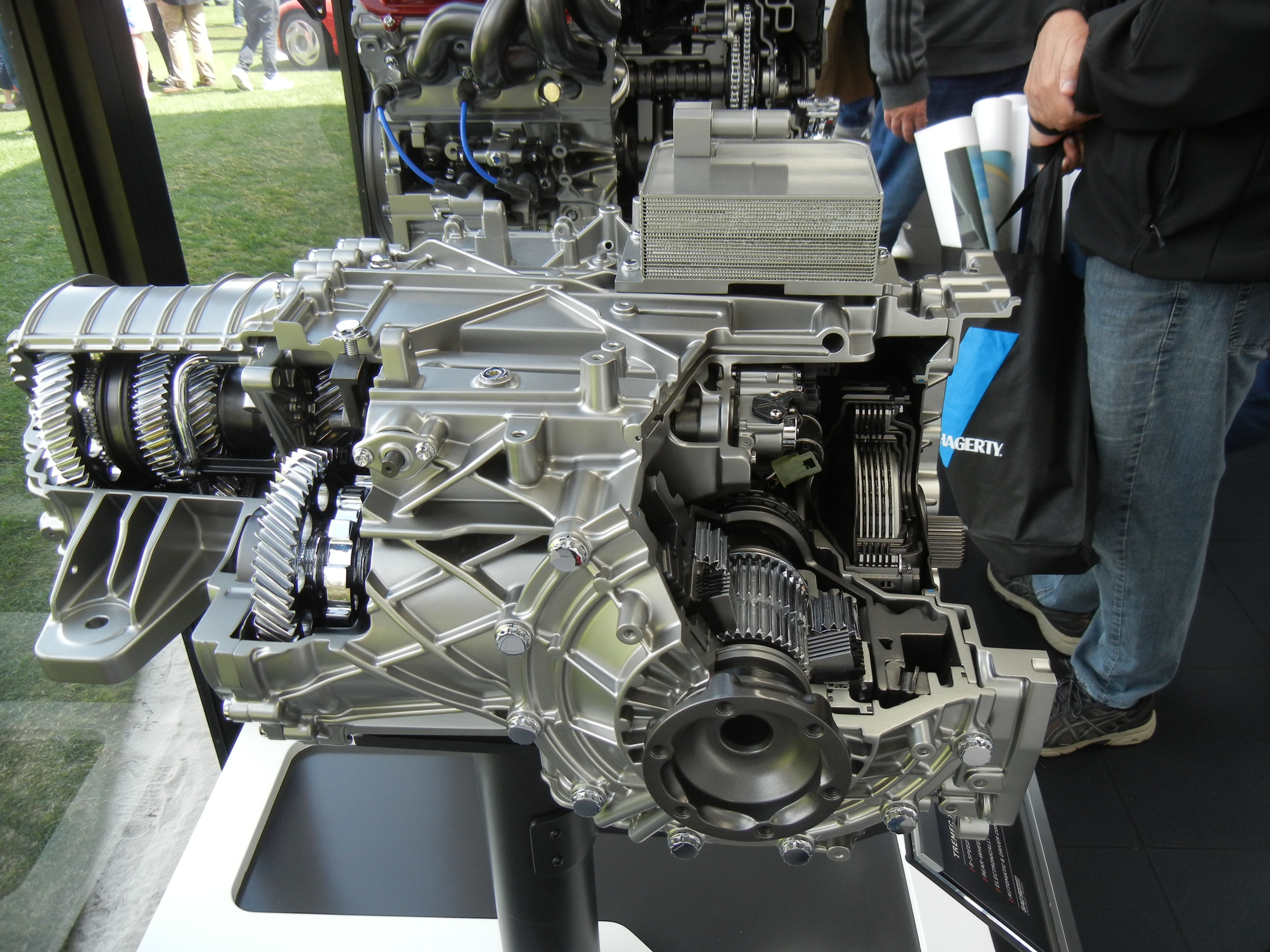
Transmission cutout

The Stingray is only offered with an 8-speed dual-clutch automated transmission made by Tremec, with paddle shifters on the steering wheel. No manual transmission option is available. The only other model years not offered with a manual transmission were the 1953–1954 C1 and the 1982 C3.

=== Suspension ===
The base model of the Stingray comes with unequal length double wishbone suspension at the front and rear axles made from forged aluminum. Monotube shock absorbers are standard at all four wheels. The car can be equipped with a front-axle lifting height adjustable suspension system that can add 2 in (40 mm) of ground clearance at speeds under 25 mph (40 km/h).

The Z51 package adds a performance-tuned adjustable suspension with higher front and rear spring rates and firmer dampers. The front shocks, on vehicles without hydraulic front lift, and the rear shocks, have threaded spring seats that allow adjustment of the preload on the coil springs.

Magnetic Selective Ride Control is an available option for all trims and levels. On Z51 equipped Corvettes, Magnetic Selective Ride Control includes Performance Traction Management and electronic limited-slip differential (eLSD).

=== Wheels ===
The Stingray is equipped with 19 in (48 cm) (front) and 20 in (51 cm) (rear) alloy wheels and Michelin Pilot Sport ALS tires, with Michelin Pilot Sport 4S tires available as a part of the Z51 performance package. All-season tires are used on base models for better grip. The exact tire dimensions are 245/35ZR-19 at the front and 305/30ZR-20 at the rear. The standard brakes are four-piston Brembo ventilated discs with diameters of 12.6 in (320 mm) at the front and 13.6 in (345 mm) at the rear. The Z51 package provides upgraded and enlarged brakes measuring 13.3 in (338 mm) at the front and 13.8 in (351 mm) at the rear.

=== Technology ===
The C8 Corvette debuted with an 8-inch infotainment screen in a driver-centric cockpit. It comes standard with Chevrolet's Infotainment 3 Plus system. Standard features include Bluetooth connectivity, 4G hotspot, and both Android Auto and Apple CarPlay. Higher trims are equipped with a 14-speaker Bose audio system and navigation options. Additional technology features include a Performance Data Recorder package for 2LT and 3LT trim levels as well as a camera based rear-view mirror. The 2020 Corvette was the first year Chevrolet introduced over-the-air updates to the Corvette lineup. This allows Chevrolet to send updates to the vehicle remotely. Chevrolet used this capability to resolve a front trunk recall for the 2020 Corvettes.

=== Right-hand-drive (RHD) ===
For the first time since the 1953 introduction of the Corvette (C1), the current generation Corvette is offered in right-hand-drive configuration for the Australian, New Zealand, Japanese, and UK markets. The Corvette (C8) is General Motors' only RHD vehicle to be assembled in the factory rather than converted from left-hand-drive. After the pre-sale announcement, 300 RHD Corvettes were sold within 60 hours: a record for Corvette sales in Japan and three times the annual sales number for its LHD predecessor. The introduction of the RHD Corvette to the Australian market was delayed to the middle of 2021 due to the reorganization of Holden Special Vehicles (HSV) into General Motors Specialty Vehicles (GMSV) which also brings GM vehicles into New Zealand. Only 200 RHD Corvettes will be sold in Australia per year, and the price is set at A$149,990 with higher performance versions above A$200,000. The first sales of the RHD C8 in New Zealand were 28 cars in 2022.

== Grand Sport ==
The Grand Sport was unveiled on March 21, 2026 with a new 6.7 liter V8, with availability in late 2026 for the 2027 model year.

=== Engine ===
The Grand Sport uses the all-new naturally aspirated 6.7L LS6 cross-plane crank V8, producing 535 hp (399 kW; 542 PS) at 6100 rpm and 520 lb⋅ft (705 N⋅m) at 4600 rpm.

== Z06 ==
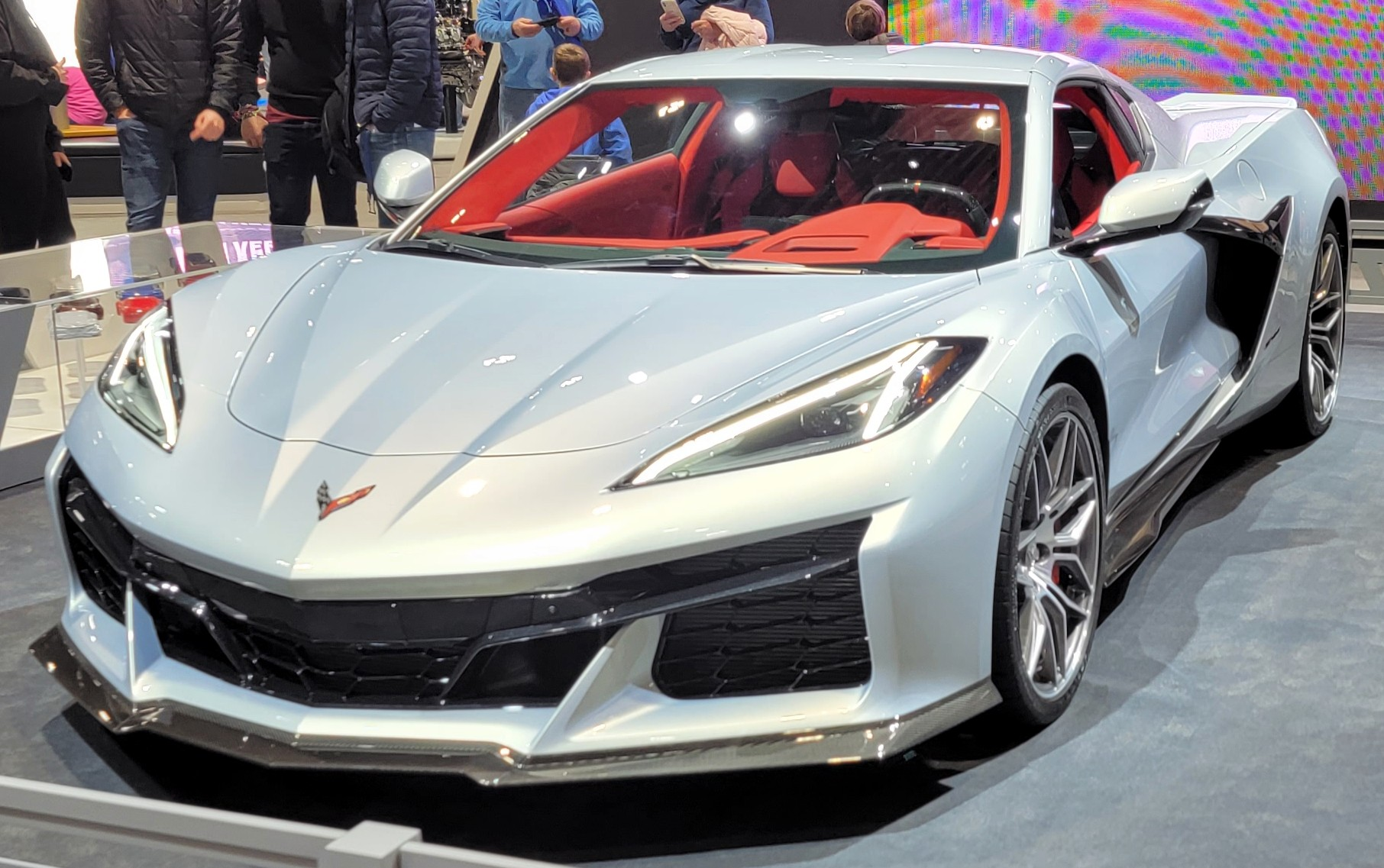
2023 Chevrolet Corvette Z06 at the 2022 Chicago Auto Show

The Z06 is an LT6-powered version of the Corvette, unveiled on October 26, 2021; it entered production in 2022 as a homologation vehicle for the 2023 model year.

=== Trim levels and options ===
The Z06 has three trim levels adding various interior comfort and technology upgrades: 1LZ, 2LZ, and 3LZ. Additionally, the Z07 Performance Package can be applied to any trim, adding improved brakes, carbon fiber aerodynamic elements, suspension tuning, and performance tires.

=== Engine ===
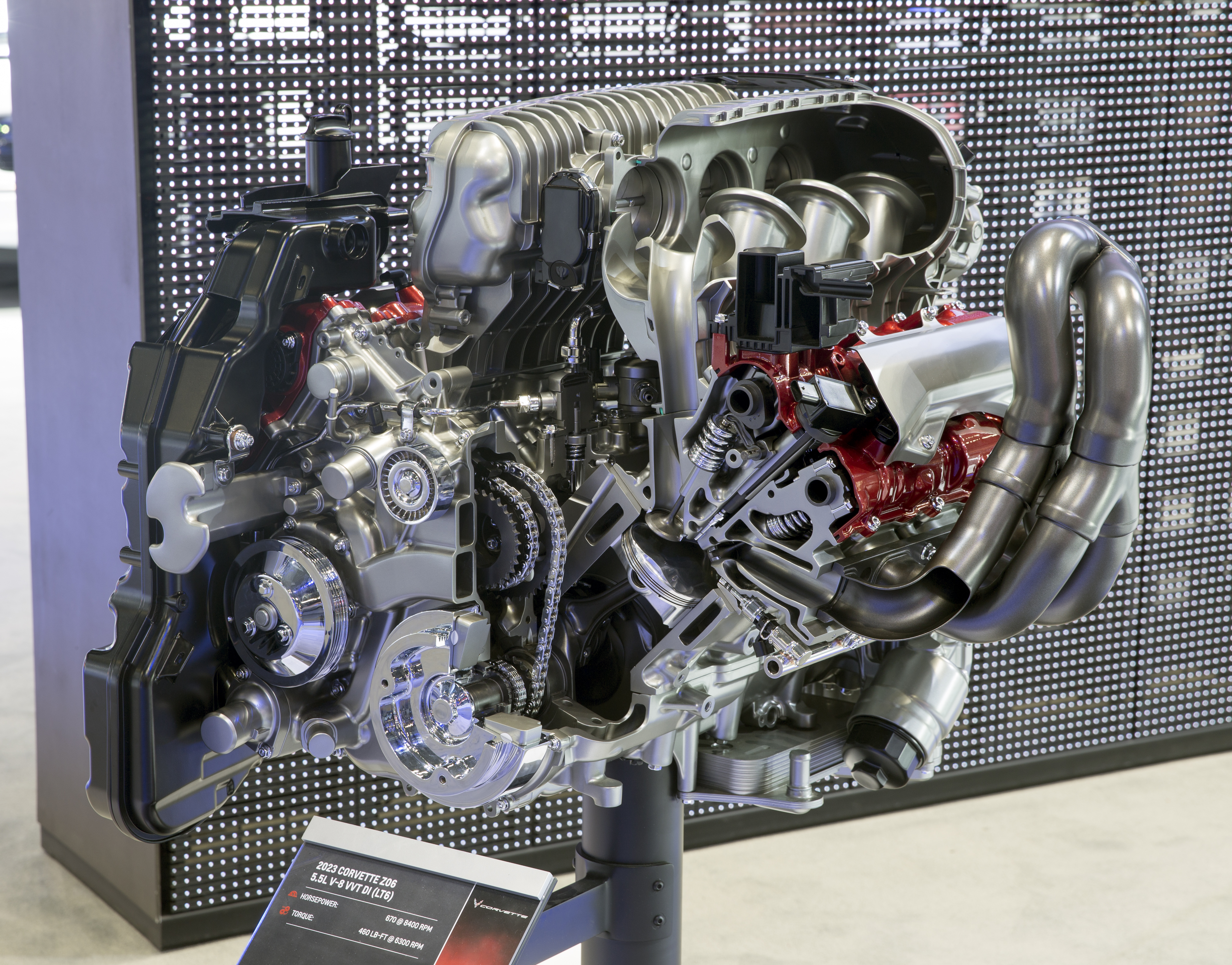
Chevrolet LT6, flat-plane crank V8

The Z06 uses the new naturally aspirated 5.5 L LT6 flat-plane crank DOHC V8, producing 670 hp (500 kW; 679 PS) at 8,400 rpm and 460 lb⋅ft (624 N⋅m) of torque at 6,300 rpm. Redlining at 8,600 rpm, the LT6 surpasses the Mercedes-Benz SLS AMG Black Series' M159 engine to become the most powerful naturally aspirated production V8. A modified version of this engine has powered the Chevrolet Corvette C8.R since 2019, and many features in the racing engine carry over to the road engine. Other features of this new engine include a cast aluminum block, dual coil valve springs supporting titanium intake & sodium filled exhaust valves, forged aluminum pistons, forged titanium connecting rods, active split intake manifold with twin 87mm throttle bodies, four-into-two-into-one stainless steel exhaust headers, and a factory six-stage 10-quart dry sump oiling system with individual crank bay scavenging. A feature the LT6 shares with other Chevrolet small blocks and the GM LS small block that preceded them is the bore spacing of 4.4 inches.

=== Transmission ===
The Z06 uses the same 8-speed dual-clutch transmission used by Stingray models, albeit with a shorter 5.56:1 final drive ratio for improved acceleration. Chevrolet says this allows the Z06 to accelerate from 0–60 mph (0–97 km/h) in 2.6 seconds.

=== Suspension ===
The Z06 features the same basic suspension setup as the Stingray, however, the electronic limited-slip differential and magnetic ride adaptive suspension system are now standard for all Z06 trims. The Z07 Performance Package includes the FE7 track-oriented suspension setup.

=== Wheels ===
The Z06's body has been widened to accommodate larger wheels and thicker tires. The wheels have diameters of 20 inches (51 cm) at the front and 21 inches (53 cm) at the rear, and are available with standard alloy or optional carbon fiber rims. The tires have dimensions of 275/30ZR20 at the front and 345/25ZR21 at the rear, and the Z07 Performance Package comes standard with Michelin Cup 2 R ZP performance tires. Chevrolet says that the optional carbon fiber wheels, supplied by Australian manufacturer Carbon Revolution, shave off 41 lb (19 kg) of unsprung weight.

=== Aerodynamics ===
The base Z06 comes with a front splitter and a rear spoiler. Under the splitter are stall gurneys to reduce drag. Included with the rear spoiler is an installable fixed Gurney flap, which when installed produces 365 lb (166 kg) pounds more downforce at 300 km/h (186 mph). The Z07 carbon fiber performance package adds a larger front-splitter, front corner canards (dive planes), a pedestal mounted rear wing, and underbody aero strakes, and removes the stall gurneys under the splitter for additional downforce. Chevrolet says that with all these equipped and in the track configuration, the Z06 is capable of 1.22g lateral acceleration on a skidpad.

=== Performance ===
Chevrolet reported a 10.6-second quarter-mile time for the Z06 model when equipped with the Z07 package. The C8 Z06 is able to reach top speeds of 195 mph (314 km/h). The Z06 model posted a 7:11.826 lap time around Germany's famed Nürburgring race track.

== E-Ray ==
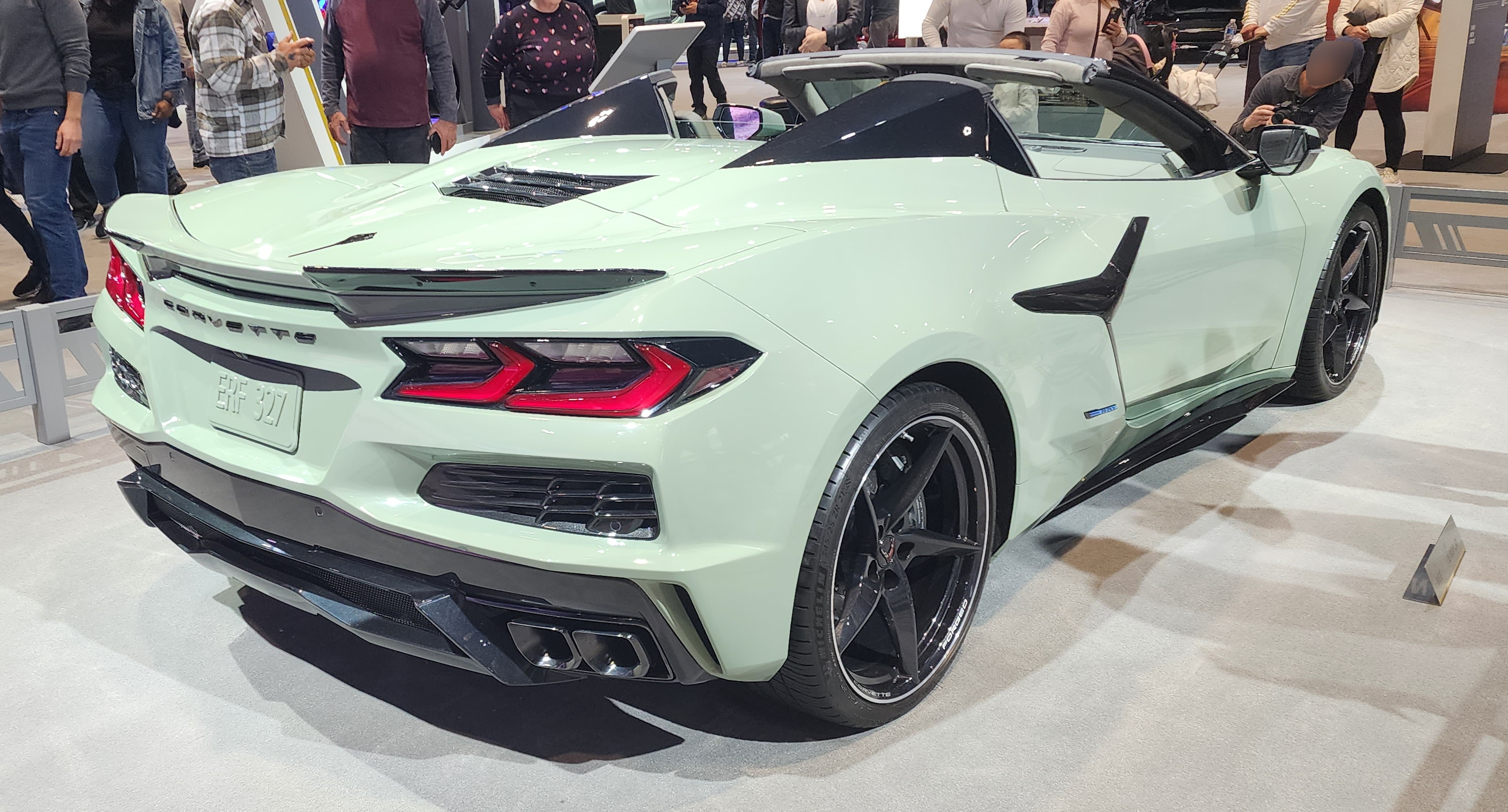
Chevrolet Corvette E-Ray

The E-Ray performance hybrid version of the C8 Corvette was unveiled on January 17, 2023. Similar to the Grand Sport model from the previous C7 generation, a significant portion of the Z06 body is reused for the E-Ray with different badging. Also, 21" rear and 20" front wheel sizes are ported from the Z06 with some unique wheel options for the E-Ray. The 6.2 L engine, DCT transmission, and performance exhaust components are reused from the C8 Stingray model. Performance hybrid 1.9 kWh battery assembly, electric motor drive assembly, regenerative braking, hybrid electronics, and hybrid cooling system are new to the E-Ray model. The E-Ray entered production as a 2024 model year Corvette. At initial product launch, it was the quickest production Corvette ever made, as well as the first with all wheel drive, and the first performance hybrid.

=== Trim levels and options ===
The E-Ray has three trim levels adding various interior comfort and technology upgrades: 1LZ, 2LZ, and 3LZ. Additionally, a ZER Performance Package can be applied to any trim. It includes summer only tires, a rear spoiler wicker extension, but no chassis tuning. The E-Ray comes standard with Performance Brembo Carbon Ceramic brakes and an eAWD drivetrain with no mechanical linkage between rear and front drivetrains.

=== Performance ===
Chevrolet reported a 10.5-second quarter-mile time and a 0–60 mph (0–97 km/h) time of 2.5 seconds, making it the quickest Corvette up to the initial E-Ray production date. The 6.2 L engine and performance exhaust combination produces 495 hp (369 kW) and 470 lb⋅ft (637 N⋅m) to the rear wheels, like the Stingray Z51 model. The performance hybrid electric drive system gives an additional 160 hp (119 kW) and 125 lb⋅ft (169 N⋅m) to the front of the vehicle for overall totals of 655 hp (488 kW) and 595 lb⋅ft (807 N⋅m). The C8 E-Ray is able to reach top speeds of 183 mph (295 km/h).

=== Modes ===
Two new electric modes for E-Ray only are Shuttle and Stealth modes. Shuttle Mode is not intended for public roads and will allow up to 15 mph. Shuttle Mode has a typical range of about 4 to 5 miles depending on the performance hybrid battery starting state of charge, vehicle speed, terrain, and other driving conditions. Stealth Mode allows for all-electric driving at a maximum speed of 45 mph, designed for quietly leaving the neighborhood with a range of up to 4 miles, depending on similar conditions as Shuttle Mode. Both Shuttle and Stealth Modes have a special sound emitted from a speaker mounted within the grille at the front of the vehicle for warning pedestrians that the vehicle is in electric only mode without any sound from the exhaust of the 6.2 L engine, which is disabled.

== ZR1 ==
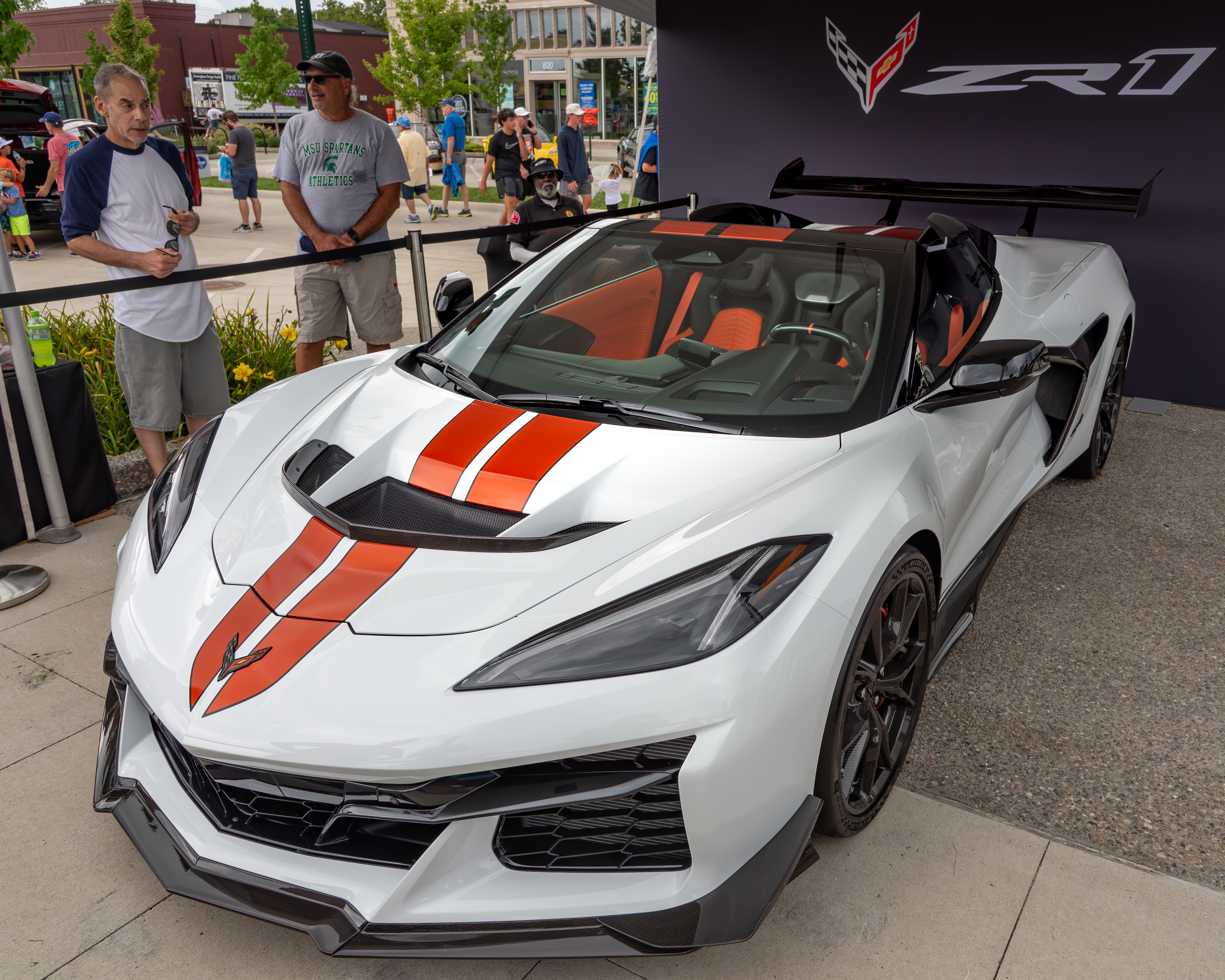
2025 Corvette ZR1

The Corvette ZR1 was revealed on July 25, 2024, at a private event in Miami, Florida, and a video revealing the vehicle was uploaded to Chevrolet's YouTube channel the same day. It is the most powerful Corvette to date, as well as the first to go into full scale production with a twin-turbocharged engine. This is in stark contrast to last generation's version of the ZR1, which instead utilized a supercharged engine located in the front. The starting price for the ZR1 is $173,300, according to the Chevrolet official website page.

=== Performance ===
The ZR1 utilizes an LT7 5.5-liter twin-turbocharged DOHC V8 engine similar to that of its sister model, the Z06, producing 1,064 hp (1,079 PS; 793 kW) at 7,000 rpm and 828 lb⋅ft (1,123 N⋅m) of torque at 6,000 rpm. According to Chevrolet, it is the most powerful V8 engine the company has ever built and is linked to an 8-speed dual-clutch transmission. The car itself has a dry weight of 3,670 pounds (1,660 kg), while the convertible weighs slightly more, at 3,758 pounds (1,705 kg). It is rear-wheel drive and has a top speed of 233 mph (375 km/h) as tested by GM president Mark Reuss.

Chevrolet claims the ZR1 can accelerate from 0–60 mph (97 km/h) in 2.3 seconds and complete a quarter mile in 9.6 seconds at 152 mph (245 km/h) when equipped with the ZTK performance package. Without the ZTK performance package, the ZR1 can accelerate from 0–60 mph (97 km/h) in 2.5 seconds and complete the quarter mile in 9.7 seconds. The ZR1 set a time of 6:50.763 around the Nürburgring race track.

=== Trim levels and options ===
There are currently two trim levels, the 1LZ and the 3LZ, starting at $173,300 and 184,300 respectively for the coupe variant. For the convertible variant, the 1LZ starts at $184,995, while the 3LZ starts at $196,195.

== ZR1X ==
The Corvette ZR1X, unveiled in 2025 introduced for the 2026 model year, is a hybrid variant of the C8 Corvette, combining the twin-turbocharged 5.5L LT7 V8 engine from the ZR1 with an upgraded version of the electric motor and all-wheel-drive system from the E-Ray. It is reported to produce a combined 1,250 hp (932 kW; 1,267 PS), making it the most powerful Corvette ever produced. Chevrolet says the ZR1X can achieve a 0–60 mph (97 km/h) time of under 2 seconds and a quarter-mile time of under 9 seconds. They also claim the ZR1X can pull 1.0 g latitudinally and longitudinally, thanks to improvements made to the chassis controls from the E-Ray’s eAWD system. The model features advanced aerodynamics, including a carbon-fiber splitter, dive planes, and a high-downforce rear wing. It also features a new standard braking kit, with Alcon 10-piston front and 6-piston rear calipers, the largest ever offered on a Corvette, paired to carbon ceramic rotors. Chevrolet says these will produce 1.9 g of deceleration from 180 mph to 120 mph. The ZR1X set a Nürburgring lap time of 6:49.275, beating the Ford Mustang GTD to set a new lap record for an American production car. However, the Mustang GTD Competition set a lap time of 6:40.8 in April 2026. This makes the ZR1X the second fastest American car around the Nürburgring.

== Model year changes ==
=== 2020 model year ===
The first production model of the C8 Corvette was the Stingray with a new mid-mounted 6.2 L LT2 V8 engine. It was available as a 2-door targa top or a retractable hardtop convertible. The targa top was available in body color, transparent, or visible carbon fiber.

=== 2021 model year ===
==== Trim levels and options ====
the 2021 model year saw a list of changes following the 2020 launch year of the C8 Corvette. Long Beach Red Metallic Tintcoat and Blade Silver Metallic were retired. Red Mist Metallic Tintcoat and Silver Flare Metallic were added as premium color options. Additionally, full length racing stripes saw 4 new color options.

The interior saw the addition of Sky Cool Gray / Strike Yellow color available only on the 3LT. Magnetic Ride became available separate to the Z51 package for the 2021 model year. The Z51 package saw a price increase from $5,000 to $5,995 starting 2021. The front lift saw an increase from $1,495 to $1,995 as well.

Wireless Apple CarPlay and Android Auto became standard in 2021. Black Trident Spoke wheels, all weather floor liners, and carbon fiber mirror covers all saw minor price increases as well.

The 2021 C8 received a base price increase, mid way through the production cycle. Chevrolet raised the base price by $1000, putting it over the $60,000 threshold. The price increase was effective for all orders entered after March 1, 2021. The increase was attributed to a fluctuation in supplier parts costs as well as the global chip shortage which has delayed production in the automotive sector as a whole.

The end of the 2021 production year also saw the end of Sebring Orange, Shadow Gray, and Zeus Bronze as exterior color options.

==== Production ====
The 2021 Corvette started production on December 8, 2020, due to extended production of the 2020 model year. The 2021 model year saw production issues due to parts constraints. Chevrolet also increased the base price of the Corvette by $1,000 in the middle of the 2021 model year, to $60,995.

=== 2022 model year ===
The LT2 saw fuel management system upgrades for the 2022 model year which featured a new fuel pump and injectors. The base price was also increased $1200 to compensate for increased supplier costs. A new IMSA GTLM Championship Edition package, limited to 1000 units, was introduced for 2022.

The 2022 model year saw the introduction of Caffeine Metallic, Amplify Orange Tintcoat, and Hypersonic Gray as new color options.

=== 2023 model year ===
GM and Chevrolet started production of the 2023 model year in the spring of 2022. 2023 saw multiple price increases early into the production year. In March, it was announced that the 2023 model year would see a $1000 base price increase. In May, the destination charge saw a minor $100 increase. During the start of production and launch of the 2023 configurator, GM raised the base price of the 2023 Corvette by $2300 making the new base price $65,595. Several packages and options saw increases and adjustment to pricing.

the 2023 model year also received a special edition variation of the Corvette to commemorate its 70th anniversary since the launch of the Corvette model. The 2023 Corvette Stingray 70th Anniversary Edition is a $5995 package atop the 3LT trim level. The special edition was offered in two exclusive colors of White Pearl Metallic Tri-Coat and Carbon Flash Metallic. Additionally, the package came with special wheels, badging, and VIN sequence to commemorate the vehicle's 70th year in the US market.

In addition to changes to the base Corvette, the Corvette Z06 was introduced with a 5.5 L LT6 V8 engine.

=== 2024 model year ===
The 2024 Corvette started production in the summer of 2023. The base price of the standard C8 went up from $64,500 to $66,300 (an increase of $1800), whereas the price of the C8 Z06 went up from $105,300 to $108,100 (an increase of $2800). No limited edition packages were added, however some additional options had. For example, more carbon fiber elements (such as a carbon fiber high wing and door mirror caps) were added to the 2LT trim, a new carbon fiber spoiler styled after the Z06 high wing was available for the base C8, and carbon fiber wheels with a red trim were available as a top end option for the Z06.

As of Summer 2023, the new hybrid Corvette C8 E-Ray was available for order starting at $102,900, although initial production was limited.

=== 2025 model year ===
The 2025 Corvette started production in the summer of 2024. The base price at launch was $69,995 for the coupe and $76,995 for the convertible. It saw a major change in color options as Chevrolet simplified the range of available colors. Ceramic Matrix Gray, Hypersonic Gray, Carbon Flash, Amplify Orange, Accelerate Yellow, Silver Flare, and Cacti Green were removed for the 2025 Corvette. Sebring Orange and Competition Yellow were brought back to the color selection from previous model year Corvettes alongside a new Hysteria Purple. The interior saw a new Habanero two tone interior limited to the 3LT trim. 4 accent packages were also new for the 2025 model year.

The 2025 Corvette also debuted the range topping C8 ZR1 featuring a twin-turbocharged version of the Z06's engine. The Corvette C8 ZR1 production and ordering began in spring 2025.

=== 2026 model year ===
The 2026 Corvette received significant updates to the interior, with the climate controls being moved below the center screen. The digital cluster and infotainment screen were enlarged to 14 inches and 12.7 inches, respectively, while a 6.6-inch configurable touchscreen was added to the left of the steering wheel. The drive mode selector was changed to a toggle switch, with a wireless charging pad occupying its previous location. The interior saw the addition of four new color choices: Sky Cool and Medium Ash Gray, Santorini Blue, Very Dark Atmosphere, and Ultimate Suede. The exterior has two new color options, Roswell Green Metallic and Blade Silver Metallic, replacing Rapid Blue and Sea Wolf Gray Tricoat.

== Production ==
Model year	Stingray		Z06		E-Ray		ZR1		Total
Model year	Coupe	Conv.	Coupe	Conv.	Coupe	Conv.	Coupe	Conv.	Total
2020	16,787	3,581							20,368
2021	15,112	11,104							26,216
2022	13,451	12,380							25,831
2023	24,834	22,538	3,109	3,304					53,785
2024	18,139	12,803	5,327	5,248	599	818			42,934
2025	8,403	5,237	4,786	4,076	1,374	1,779	115	65	25,835

== Awards ==
The Corvette C8 was named 2020 Motor Trend Car of the Year, and was also featured on 2020 Car and Driver 10Best. The C8 was also named 2020 North American Car of the Year, 2020 Detroit Free Press Car of the Year, 2020 MotorWeek Drivers' Choice Best of the Year, and Edmunds Top Rated Sports Car for 2020 and 2021.

The Corvette C8 Z06 won both the MotorTrend Performance Vehicle of the Year and the Road & Track Performance Car of the Year, both for 2023.

The Corvette C8 Stingray and E-Ray won the 2025 Car and Driver 10 Best.

== Motorsport ==
=== C8.R ===
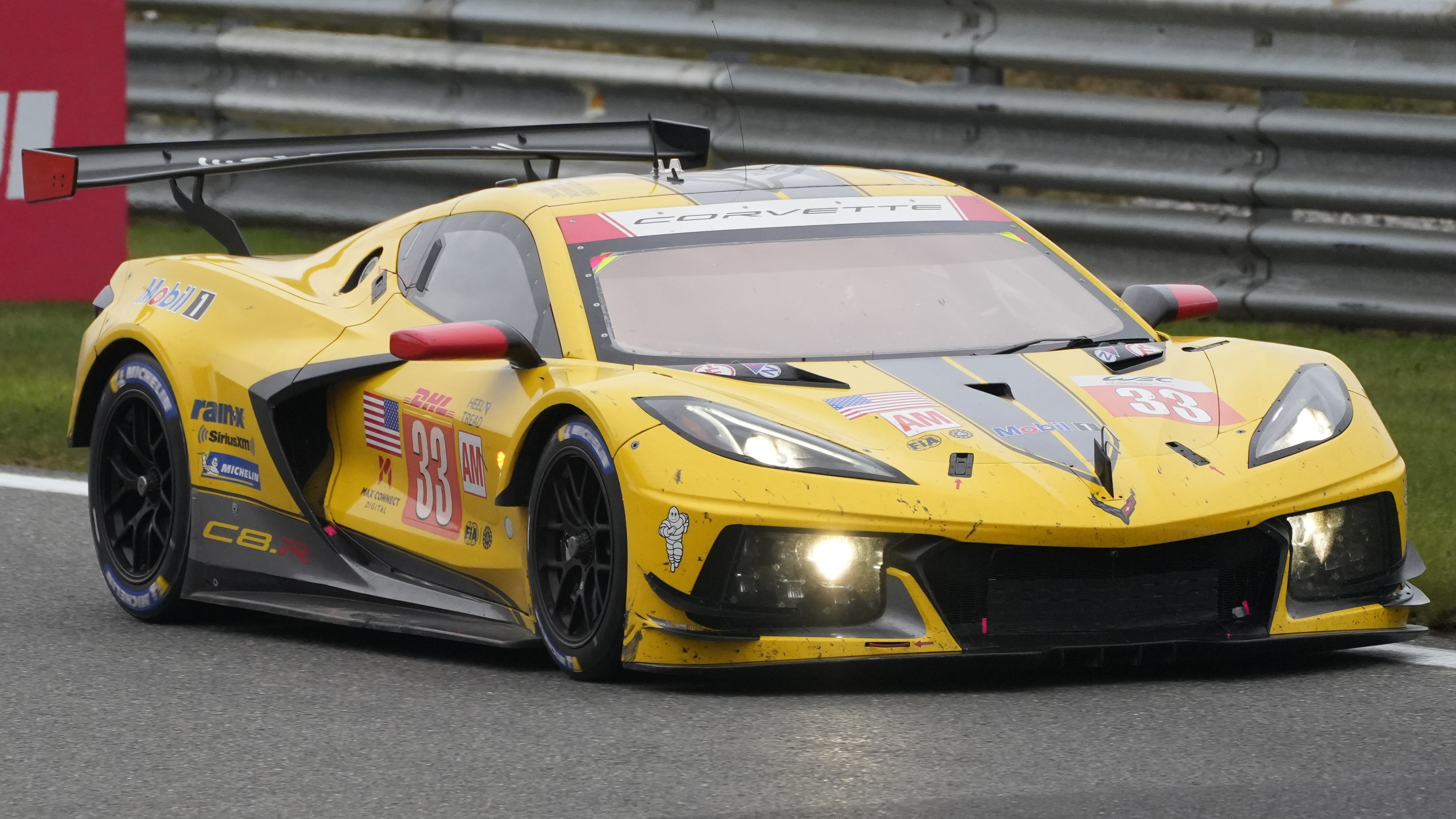
The Chevrolet Corvette C8.R at the 2023 6 Hours of Spa-Francorchamps.

The racing version of the base model C8, called the Chevrolet Corvette C8.R, was unveiled in 2019 alongside the Corvette C8 convertible. Built to LM GTE regulations, the C8.R was the first mid-engined Corvette built for racing by Chevrolet and Pratt Miller Motorsports, as well as the first Corvette race car to use a flat-plane crank V8. It completed its debut in the 2020 24 Hours of Daytona. The C8.R won a total of three Teams' championships and three Drivers' championships during its tenure, before being retired in 2024 following the discontinuation of the LM GTE ruleset.

=== Z06 GT3.R ===
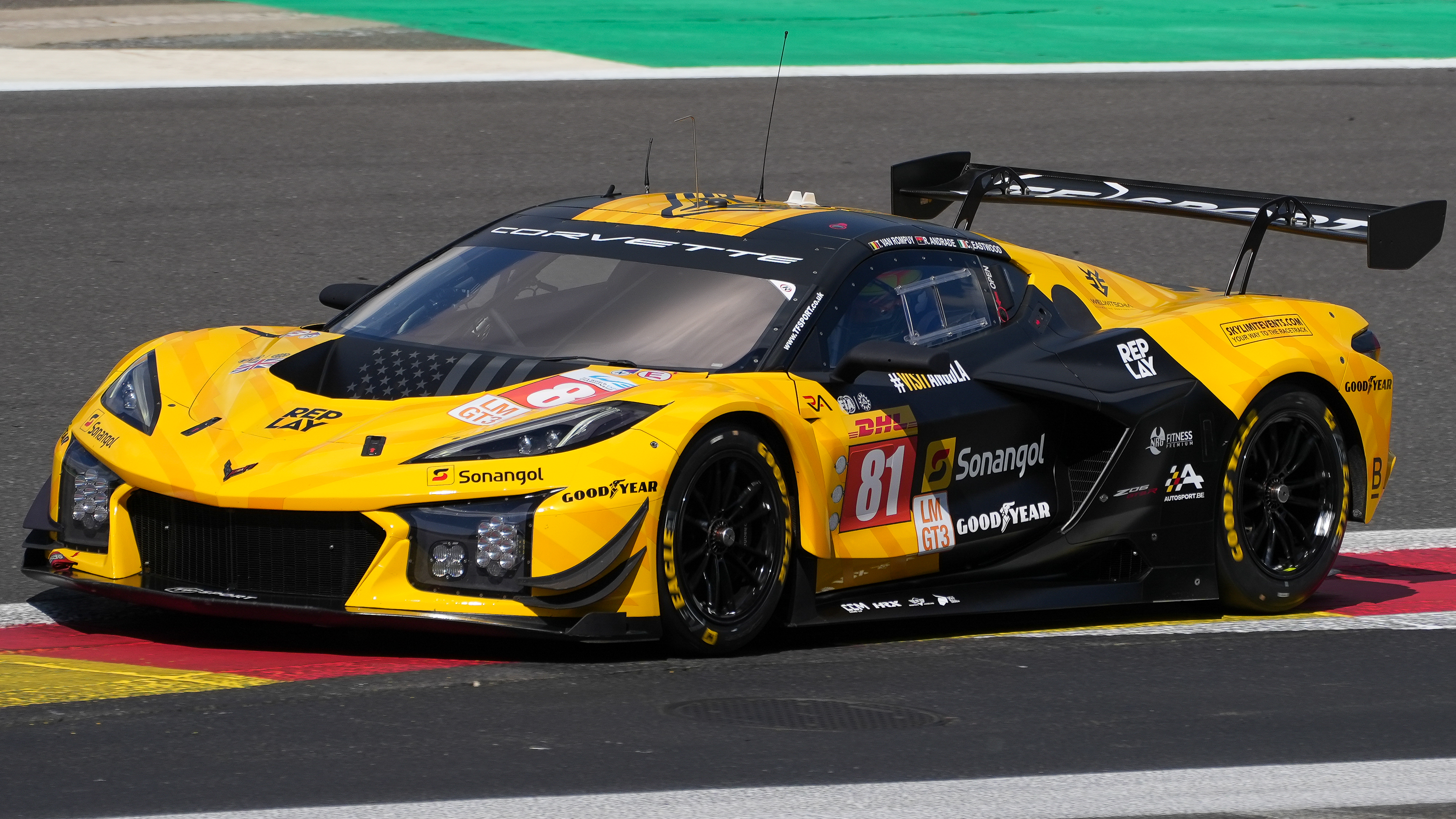
The Chevrolet Corvette Z06 GT3.R at the 2024 6 Hours of Spa-Francorchamps.

The Z06-based Chevrolet Corvette Z06 GT3.R was first revealed in 2023, following a two-year testing program, beginning with virtual simulation tests in early 2021, later moving to on-track testing in 2022 and 2023. It served as the successor to the C8.R and the Callaway Corvette C7 GT3-R. The Z06 GT3.R made its competitive debut at the 2024 24 Hours of Daytona.
