= List of fastest production cars by acceleration =

This list is limited to unmodified production cars that meet the eligibility criteria below. All entries must be able to be verified from reliable sources. Up to one percent decline from start to finish is allowed. Times driven privately or by manufacturers need the presence of an independent, reliable source or at least some video footage to confirm the car and tire condition to qualify as independent. Self-published video such as YouTube, including drag race videos, should not be considered reliable sources for this list.

== Eligible cars ==
Because of the inconsistencies with the various definitions of production cars, dubious claims by manufacturers and self-interested groups, and inconsistent or changing application of the definitions, this list has a defined set of requirements. For further explanation of how these were arrived at see the links above.

=== Production car definition ===
For the purposes of this list, a production car is defined as:

1. Being constructed principally for retail sale to consumers for their personal use, and to transport people on public roads (no commercial or industrial vehicles are eligible);
2. Fitted with the original manufacturer-supplied road tires;
3. Having had 25 or more articles made by the original vehicle manufacturer and offered for commercial sale to the public in new condition (Note: It's sufficient if 25 cars were sold and deliveries have started.) (pre-production prototypes, and cars modified by either professional tuners or individuals, are not eligible);
4. Being street-legal in their intended markets and capable of passing any official tests or inspections required to be granted this status.

== By 0–60 mph (97 km/h) (less than 3.0 s) ==
Many elements change how fast the car can accelerate to 60 mph. (Note: Various factors can contribute to variability in car speed test results. British and U.S. car measurements quote 0–60 miles/hour and 1/4 mile times while European car measurements quote 0–100 kilometers/hour and 400 meter times (which translate to 0–96.5606 kilometers/hour and 402.336 meter times, or to 0–62.1371 miles/hour and 1/4.02336 mile times, respectively)) (Note: Most measurements exclude an initial "rollout", which according to Car and Driver "can affect the elapsed time by as much as 0.3 second". Furthermore, environmental conditions change how fast the car drives (tires, surface of testing track, wind, elevation above sea level (especially for non-electric vehicles), weight of the driver, and equipment used for testing are all critical). Times sourced for example by Car and Driver, are modified artificially using computer software after the drive test is complete, to theoretically account for how the car would have performed differently given different weather conditions.) Tires, elevation above sea level, weight of the driver, testing equipment, weather conditions and surface of testing track all influence these times. Since one-foot rollout before the timer starts is used by some North American publications, times which exclude the time of the first foot of acceleration are included. All times are independently tested and verified.

Car (Note: Car models similar to an already mentioned model but differentiated only by minor package options (for example "convertible editions") are omitted acknowledging that speed results with those editions can be only slightly less fast. In the case of a tie between two cars, since there exist a variety of different opinions regarding the interpretation of, for example, 1/4 mile trap speed results, the car shown first is the one with the earlier model year (of the fast time's represented model, and not necessarily of any driven car) or if both years are the same it goes to the car having the earliest date associated with the performance data's verification or publishing.)	Model year (Note: This is the earliest model year of the car that can claim all its following listed data without later modification. This is not necessarily the model year of any driven car, the year when testing was performed, the year during which owners took first delivery of the model, the year it was unveiled, or when it was built.)	Propulsion	Time	Limited number	Noted specifications (Note: List specifications of the tested car here when multiple factory configurations for the model are available, e.g. RWD or AWD, tire options, special option packages, engine output, software updates, etc. If the model is only available in a single configuration, leave it blank.)
Rimac Nevera R	2024	Electric	1.66 s	40	
Chevrolet Corvette (C8) ZR1X (Note: all-wheel drive)	2026	Hybrid	1.8 s (Note: Re-test; previous test with the same car returned 2.1 s. Lower time attributed to new set of Michelin Pilot Sport Cup 2R tires, more grip at the Michigan test location versus the previous one in California, and ideal weather conditions.)		
Lucid Air Sapphire	2024	Electric	1.881 s		Pirelli P Zero Trofeo RS Elect tires
Porsche Taycan Turbo GT	2025	Electric	1.898 s	—N/a	Pirelli P Zero Trofeo RS tires
Tesla Model S Plaid	2021	Electric	1.98 s (Note: on VHT-prepped surface, timer started after 1 foot at a speed of 5.9 mph. It registered 2.07 seconds on unprepped asphalt surface, timer started after 1 foot at a speed of 5 mph.)	—N/a	
Porsche 911 Turbo S (992.2)	2026	Hybrid	2.0 s	—N/a	
Ferrari SF90 Stradale	2021	Hybrid	2.0 s	—N/a	
Porsche Cayenne Turbo Electric	2026	Electric	2.1 s		
Porsche 918 Spyder	2015	Hybrid	2.1 s	918	
Porsche 911 Turbo S (992.1)	2020	ICE	2.1 s	—N/a	Lightweight Package, Pirelli P Zero PZ4 tires
Lamborghini Revuelto	2024	Hybrid	2.2 s	—N/a	
Lamborghini Huracán Performante	2018	ICE	2.2 s	—N/a	
Bugatti Chiron Super Sport	2021	ICE	2.2 s	100-110 (Note: 30 of them are Super Sport 300+)	
Chevrolet Corvette (C8) ZR1	2025	ICE	2.2 s	—N/a	with ZTK package
Tesla Model S P100D	2017 (Note: Tesla vehicles don’t have traditional model years per se in the sense of design revisions being pushed out annually. In 2016, the 100kWh battery option was introduced while the software update that made it possible to achieve the times currently listed was released in 2017.)	Electric	2.28 s (Note: Time includes rollout; time without rollout is 2.53 s)	—N/a	with Ludicrous+ Update
Ferrari 296 GTB	2023	Hybrid	2.3 s	—N/a	
McLaren 750S	2024	ICE	2.3 s		
Bugatti Veyron	2005	ICE	2.4 s	450 (Note: of which 30 were Super Sport)	
Bugatti Chiron Sport	2017	ICE	2.4 s	60	
Porsche Taycan Turbo S	2020	Electric	2.4 s	—N/a	
Tesla Model S Performance	2020	Electric	2.4 s	—N/a	Ludicrous Mode with Cheetah Stance update
Mercedes-AMG GT63 S E Performance	2025	Hybrid	2.4 s	—N/a	
Nissan GT-R Nismo	2020	ICE	2.48 s	—N/a	
Porsche 911 Turbo S (991 and 991.2)	2014	ICE	2.5 s	—N/a	
Tesla Model X Plaid	2021	Electric	2.5 s	—N/a	
Lamborghini Huracán	2015	ICE	2.5 s	—N/a	
Porsche 911 GT2 RS (991)	2018	ICE	2.5 s	—N/a	
McLaren 720S	2018	ICE	2.5 s	—N/a	
BMW M8 Competition	2019	ICE	2.5 s	—N/a	
Lamborghini Aventador SVJ	2019	ICE	2.5 s	963	
Chevrolet Corvette (C8) E-Ray	2024	Hybrid	2.5 s	—N/a	
Porsche 911 Turbo S (997)	2011	ICE	2.6 s	—N/a	
Lamborghini Aventador SV	2015	ICE	2.6 s	600	
Tesla Model S P90D	2015	Electric	2.6 s	—N/a	Ludicrous Mode
McLaren P1	2015	Hybrid	2.6 s	375	
Audi R8 V10 Plus	2017	ICE	2.6 s	—N/a	
Mercedes-AMG GT 63 S	2018	ICE	2.6 s	—N/a	
Dodge Challenger SRT Demon	2018	ICE	2.6 s	3300	1-seat
BMW M5 Competition	2019	ICE	2.6 s	—N/a	
BMW M5 CS	2020	ICE	2.6 s	1000	
Lamborghini Huracán STO	2021	ICE	2.6 s	—N/a	
Porsche Panamera Turbo S	2021	ICE	2.6 s	—N/a	
Lucid Air Dream Edition Performance	2022	Electric	2.6 s	520 (Note: includes both Performance and Range trims)	
McLaren Artura	2023	Hybrid	2.6 s	—N/a	
Chevrolet Corvette (C8) Z06	2023	ICE	2.6 s	—N/a	with Z07 package
Tesla Cybertruck	2024	Electric	2.6 s	—N/a	Tri-Motor Cyberbeast
Rivian R1S	2025	Electric	2.6 s	—N/a	Quad Motor
Mercedes-AMG S 63 E Performance	2025	Hybrid	2.6 s	—N/a	
Lamborghini Aventador	2012	ICE	2.7 s	—N/a	
McLaren 650S	2015	ICE	2.7 s	—N/a	
McLaren 570S	2017	ICE	2.7 s	—N/a	
Ferrari 488 Pista	2019	ICE	2.7 s	—N/a	
BMW M8 Competition Gran Coupe	2020	ICE	2.7 s	—N/a	
Porsche 911 GT3 (992)	2021	ICE	2.7 s	—N/a	
Porsche Panamera Sport Turismo Turbo S E-Hybrid	2018	Hybrid	2.8 s	—N/a	
Ferrari 812 Superfast	2018	ICE	2.8 s	—N/a	
Mercedes-AMG E 63 S 4MATIC+	2018	ICE	2.8 s	—N/a	
Porsche 911 GT3 RS (991.2)	2019	ICE	2.8 s	—N/a	
Porsche 911 Carrera 4S (992)	2020	ICE	2.8 s	—N/a	
Chevrolet Corvette (C8) Stingray	2020	ICE	2.8 s	—N/a	Z51
Porsche 911 Carrera GTS and Carrera 4 GTS (992)	2022	ICE	2.8 s	—N/a	
Porsche Cayenne Turbo GT	2022	ICE	2.8 s	—N/a	
BMW M3 Competition xDrive	2023	ICE	2.8 s	—N/a	
BMW M4 Competition xDrive	2023	ICE	2.8 s	—N/a	
McLaren 12C	2012	ICE	2.9 s	—N/a	
McLaren Senna	2019	ICE	2.9 s	500	
Porsche Taycan Turbo	2020	Electric	2.9 s	—N/a	
Porsche 911 Carrera S (992)	2020	ICE	2.9 s	—N/a	
Mercedes-AMG GT Black Series	2021	ICE	2.9 s	1700	
Honda NSX Type S	2022	Hybrid	2.9 s	350	
Lamborghini Urus	2019	ICE	2.93 s	—N/a	
Tesla Model 3 Performance	2019	Electric	2.998 s	—N/a	with 2019 power increase update

== By 1/4 mile times (11.0 s or less) ==
Car	Year	Propulsion	Time		Limited number	Noted specifications
Car	Year	Propulsion	Up to 1 foot (305 mm) rollout	From standing	Limited number	Noted specifications
Rimac Nevera R	2024	Electric	7.90 s at 300 km/h (186.41 mph)		40	
Koenigsegg Jesko Absolut	2025	ICE	8.54 s at 305.4 km/h (189.76 mph)	—N/a (Note: standing start time is approximately 0.25 seconds slower than time with rollout)	—N/a	
Chevrolet Corvette (C8) ZR1X	2026	Hybrid	8.9 s at 249.4 km/h (155 mph)	—N/a	—N/a	
Porsche Taycan Turbo GT	2025	Electric	9.06 s at 243.9 km/h (151.53 mph)	—N/a	—N/a	
Bugatti Chiron Super Sport	2021	ICE	9.1 s at 259.1 km/h (161 mph)	—N/a	100-110	
Lucid Air Sapphire	2023	Electric	9.1 s at 251.1 km/h (156 mph)	—N/a	—N/a	
Tesla Model S Plaid	2021	Electric	9.264 s at 244.3 km/h (151.83 mph)	—N/a	—N/a	
Bugatti Chiron Sport	2018	ICE	9.4 s at 254.3 km/h (158 mph)	—N/a	60	
Lamborghini Revuelto	2024	Hybrid	9.4 s at 235.0 km/h (146 mph)	—N/a	—N/a	
Ferrari SF90 Stradale	2021	Hybrid	9.5 s at 238.2 km/h (148 mph)	—N/a	—N/a	
Lotus Evija	2024	Electric	9.5 s at 276.2 km/h (171.6 mph)	—N/a	130	
Chevrolet Corvette ZR1	2025	ICE	9.5 s at 239.8 km/h (149 mph)	—N/a (Note: standing start time is approximately 0.2 seconds slower than time with rollout)	—N/a	with ZTK package
Ferrari 296 GTB	2023	Hybrid	9.6 s at 240.8 km/h (149.6 mph)	—N/a	—N/a	
Porsche 911 Turbo S (992.2)	2026	Hybrid	9.7 s at 228.5 km/h (142 mph)	—N/a	—N/a	
Porsche 918 Spyder	2015	Hybrid	9.7 s at 233.4 km/h (145 mph)	9.81 s at 238.6 km/h (148.3 mph)	918	
McLaren P1	2015	Hybrid	9.8 s at 239.6 km/h (148.9 mph)	10.2 s at 237.4 km/h (147.5 mph)	375	Autocar road test No 5164
Bugatti Veyron Super Sport	2010	ICE	9.9 s at 239 km/h (148.5 mph)	—N/a	30	16.4 Super Sport, World Record Edition
McLaren 720S	2018	ICE	9.9 s at 238.5 km/h (148.2 mph)	10.02 s at 234.1 km/h (145.5 mph)	—N/a	
Porsche 911 Turbo S (992)	2020	ICE	9.9 s at 223.7 km/h (139 mph)	10.28 s at 217.32 km/h (135.04 mph)	—N/a	
Bugatti Veyron	2005	ICE	10.1 s at 228.5 km/h (142 mph)	—N/a	420	
Porsche 911 GT2 RS (991)	2018	ICE	10.1 s at 221.9 km/h (137.9 mph) (Note: 140 mph (225.3 km/h) reached by Car and Driver)		—N/a	
McLaren Senna	2019	ICE	10.1 s at 237.3 km/h (147.5 mph)	—N/a	500	
Ferrari 488 Pista	2019	ICE	10.1 s at 231.9 km/h (144.1 mph)	10.2 s at 230 km/h (142.9 mph)	—N/a	
Lamborghini Huracán Performante	2018	ICE	10.2 s at 218.9 km/h (136 mph)	10.26 s at 220.7 km/h (137.1 mph)	—N/a	
Lamborghini Aventador SVJ	2019	ICE	10.3 s at 219.5 km/h (136.4 mph)	—N/a	963	
Porsche Taycan Turbo S	2020	Electric	10.3 s at 214.5 km/h (133.3 mph)	10.5 s at 211.5 km/h (131.4 mph)	—N/a	
McLaren Artura	2023	Hybrid	10.3 s at 225.3 km/h (140 mph)	—N/a	—N/a	
Lamborghini Aventador	2012	ICE	10.4 s at 218.9 km/h (136 mph)	—N/a	—N/a	
Lamborghini Aventador SV	2015	ICE	10.4 s at 216.8 km/h (134.7 mph)	10.47 s	600	
McLaren 650S	2015	ICE	10.4 s at 219.0 km/h (136.1 mph)	10.5 s at 224 km/h (139.2 mph)	—N/a	
Lamborghini Huracán	2015	ICE	10.4 s at 217.3 km/h (135 mph)	10.6 s at 216 km/h (134.2 mph)	—N/a	
Mercedes-AMG GT 63 S E Performance	2025	Hybrid	10.4 s at 217.3 km/h (135 mph)	10.5 s at 217 km/h (134.8 mph)	—N/a	
Ferrari 812 Superfast	2018	ICE	10.5 s at 222 km/h (138 mph)	10.5 s	—N/a	
Chevrolet Corvette Z06	2023	ICE	10.5 s at 211 km/h (131 mph)	—N/a	—N/a	with Z07 package
McLaren 570S	2016	ICE	10.5 s		—N/a	
Lamborghini Huracán STO	2021	ICE	10.5 s at 219 km/h (136 mph)	—N/a	—N/a	
Rivian R1S	2025	Electric	10.5 at 206.3 km/h (128.2 mph)			Quad Motor
Audi R8 V10 Plus	2016	ICE	10.51 s (Note: 213.7 km/h (132.8 mph) reached in the Quattroruote 2/2016 test)		—N/a	
Tesla Model S P100D	2017	Electric	10.51 s at 201.2 km/h (125 mph)	—N/a	—N/a	
BMW M5 CS	2020	ICE	10.6 s at 209.2 km/h (130 mph)	—N/a	1000	
Chevrolet Corvette E-Ray	2024	Hybrid	10.6 s at 206 km/h (128 mph)	—N/a	—N/a	
Mercedes-AMG GT Black Series	2021	ICE	10.6 s at 218 km/h (136.1 mph)	10.71 s	1700	
Ford Shelby GT500	2020	ICE	10.61 s at 214 km/h (133 mph)	—N/a	5000	
Porsche 911 Turbo S (997)	2011	ICE	10.7 s at 207.4 km/h (128.9 mph)	10.91 s	—N/a	
McLaren 12C	2012	ICE	10.7 s at 215.7 km/h (134 mph)	11.6 s at 208.4 km/h (129.5 mph)	—N/a	
Dodge Challenger SRT Demon	2018	ICE	10.7 s (Note: Dodge didn't allow independent magazine testers to use their own measuring equipment or turn on dragstrip timers, the best Road & Track could get was 2.6 seconds to 60 mph and 10.7 for the quarter-mile, Motor Trend got 11.0 as best time self-reported from the car.)	—N/a	3300	1-seat
BMW M8 Competition	2019	ICE	10.7 s at 207.6 km/h (129 mph)	10.70 s (Note: 10.8 s at 209 km/h (129.9 mph) reached in another test)	—N/a	
Mercedes-AMG GT 63 S 4MATIC+	2019	ICE	10.7 s at 207.6 km/h (129 mph)	10.9 s (Note: 0-200 km/h in 10.33 seconds)	—N/a	
LaFerrari	2015	Hybrid	10.738 s at 217 km/h (135 mph) (Note: Ferrari didn't allow standard tests on neutral ground for the LaFerrari, the acceleration numbers in the magazines were obtained downhill on the Ferrari test track with a specially prepared car on Ferrari's terms. Motor Trend´s LaFerrari report published a 9.7 second 1/4 mile after the 9.9 second result was rewritten to account for weather. Motor Trend stated: "Fiorano's downhill front straight was the only place we were allowed to do acceleration runs, and we couldn't run backward for a two-way average. The data shows the fastest quarter-mile run declining by 18.2 feet from start to finish, or 1.4%. For reference, the National Hot Rod Association allows a 1.0 percent maximum grade over the course of a quarter mile. It's difficult to say how much of an advantage this gives the LaFerrari, but it helps enough that we'll asterisk these results until we can test a car on level ground". 0-60 mph in 3.68 s and 1/4 mile of 11.03 s @ 141.75 mph were measured on neutral ground.)	—N/a	499	
McLaren F1	1995	ICE	10.8 s at 229 km/h (142.3 mph)	106		
Tesla Model S P90D	2016	Electric	10.8 s at 196.3 km/h (121.99 mph)	—N/a	—N/a	Ludicrous Mode upgrade
Ford GT	2017	ICE	10.8 s at 216.6 km/h (134 mph)	—N/a	—N/a	
Chevrolet Corvette ZR1	2019	ICE	10.8 s at 214.2 km/h (133.1 mph)	—N/a	—N/a	
BMW M5 Competition	2019	ICE	10.8 s at 209.2 km/h (130 mph)	10.9 s at 207 km/h (128.6 mph)	—N/a	
Porsche 911 GT3 (992)	2021	ICE	10.8 s at 206.6 km/h (128.4 mph)	—N/a		
Chevrolet Corvett Z06	2016	ICE	10.9 s at 213.6 km/h (132.7 mph)	—N/a	without Z07 package	
Dodge Viper SRT-10	2008	ICE	10.92 s at 208.9 km/h (129.8 mph)	—N/a	—N/a	
Tesla Model X Performance w/Ludicrous Mode	2020	Electric	10.92 s at 195.9 km/h (121.74 mph)	—N/a	—N/a	
Porsche Carrera GT	2003	ICE	10.97 s (Note: 400m test, 214.7 km/h (133.4 mph) reached after 1/4 mile in another test)		1270	
Maserati MC20	2022	ICE	11.0 s at 210.8 km/h (131 mph)	—N/a		
BMW M4 Competition xDrive	2023	ICE	11.0 s at (125 mph)	—N/a	—N/a	
BMW M3 Competition xDrive	2023	ICE	11.0 s at (124mph)	—N/a	—N/a	

== By 0–100 km/h (62 mph) time (3.0 s or less) ==
These are standing start (no rollout allowed) acceleration times measured by independent, reliable sources (thus these are not precisely comparable with the first table where even 9.5-96.6 km/h times are allowed).

Car	Year	Propulsion	Time	Notes
Rimac Nevera R	2024	Electric	1.72 s	1571 kW
Audi RS e-tron GT performance	2024	Electric	2.19 s	680 kW
Porsche 911 Turbo S (992)	2020	ICE	2.5 s	478 kW
Tesla Model S Plaid	2023	Electric	2.5 s	760 kW
Porsche 918 Spyder	2013	Hybrid	2.53 s	652 kW
Porsche 911 GT2 RS (991)	2017	ICE	2.55 s	515 kW
Lamborghini Huracán Performante and Evo	2017	ICE	2.6 s	471 kW
Porsche Taycan Turbo S	2019	Electric	2.6 s	560 kW
Bugatti Veyron Super Sport	2010	ICE	2.7 s	883 kW
Porsche 911 Turbo S (991.2)	2016	ICE	2.7 s	427 kW
McLaren 720S	2017	ICE	2.7 s	530 kW
Porsche 911 Turbo S (991)	2013	ICE	2.8 s	412 kW
Audi R8 V10 Plus	2015	ICE	2.8 s	449 kW
Lamborghini Aventador SV	2015	ICE	2.8 s	552 kW
Mercedes-AMG GT 63 S E-Performance	2022	Hybrid	2.8 s	620 kW
Bugatti Veyron	2005	ICE	2.84 s	736 kW
McLaren 570s	2016	ICE	2.9 s	419 kW
BMW M5 Competition	2018	ICE	2.9 s	469 kW
Ferrari 488 Pista	2018	ICE	2.9 s	530 kW
Tesla Model S Performance w/Ludicrous Mode	2019	Electric	2.9 s	449 kW
BMW M5 CS	2020	ICE	2.9 s	467 kW
Chevrolet Corvette (C8) Stingray Z51	2020	ICE	2.9 s	369 kW
Ferrari 296 GTB	2022	ICE	2.9 s	610 kW
Mercedes-AMG GT 63 S 4MATIC+	2018	ICE	2.99 s	470 kW
Porsche 911 Turbo S (997)	2010	ICE	3.0 s	390 kW
McLaren 675LT	2015	ICE	3.0 s	496 kW
Ferrari 812 Superfast	2017	ICE	3.0 s	588 kW
BMW M8 Competition	2019	ICE	3.0 s	460 kW
Nissan GT-R Nismo	2020	ICE	3.0 s	441 kW
Porsche Panamera Turbo S	2020	ICE	3.0 s	463 kW
Porsche 911 GT3 (992)	2021	ICE	3.0 s	375 kW

== See also ==
- List of production car speed records
- List of production cars by power output
