= Rollout (drag racing) =

Drag racing measurement

Rollout or rollout allowance is an adjustment in timed acceleration runs used by North-American drag racing and enthusiast magazines to create approximate parity over time between historic 0 to 60 mph and 1/4 mile acceleration times and those measured using the Global Positioning System (GPS).

Historically, light gates were used at the beginning and end of acceleration runs. These measured the end of runs accurately, but only began timing once a vehicle began to move (enough to trigger the light gate). Since this was the standard method, published acceleration times reflected a consistent "rolling start" inaccuracy across races, records, road tests, and enthusiast magazine reviews. Since the error was impossible to eliminate and applied to all vehicles in all timed runs it was simply ignored as a "net wash".

It only became an issue with the advent to modern GPS, which records a speed run from a standing start. To create parity with the historic method (and historic record), a convention evolved in North America to approximate the rolling start by subtracting the time it takes for a vehicle to cover its first 1 foot (30 cm) from total recorded elapsed time.
