= Tesla Semi =

Electric Class 8 semi-trailer truck

Overview
- Manufacturer: Tesla, Inc.
- Production: 2022–present
- Assembly: United States: Storey County, Nevada (Gigafactory Nevada)

Body and chassis
- Class: Semi-trailer truck (Class 8)
- Body style: Tractor unit

Powertrain
- Propulsion: 3 electric motors
- Battery: 822 & 548 kWh, 1,000 V
- Electric range: 500 mi (800 km), 325 miles (520 km)
- Plug-in charging: 1.2 MW MCS

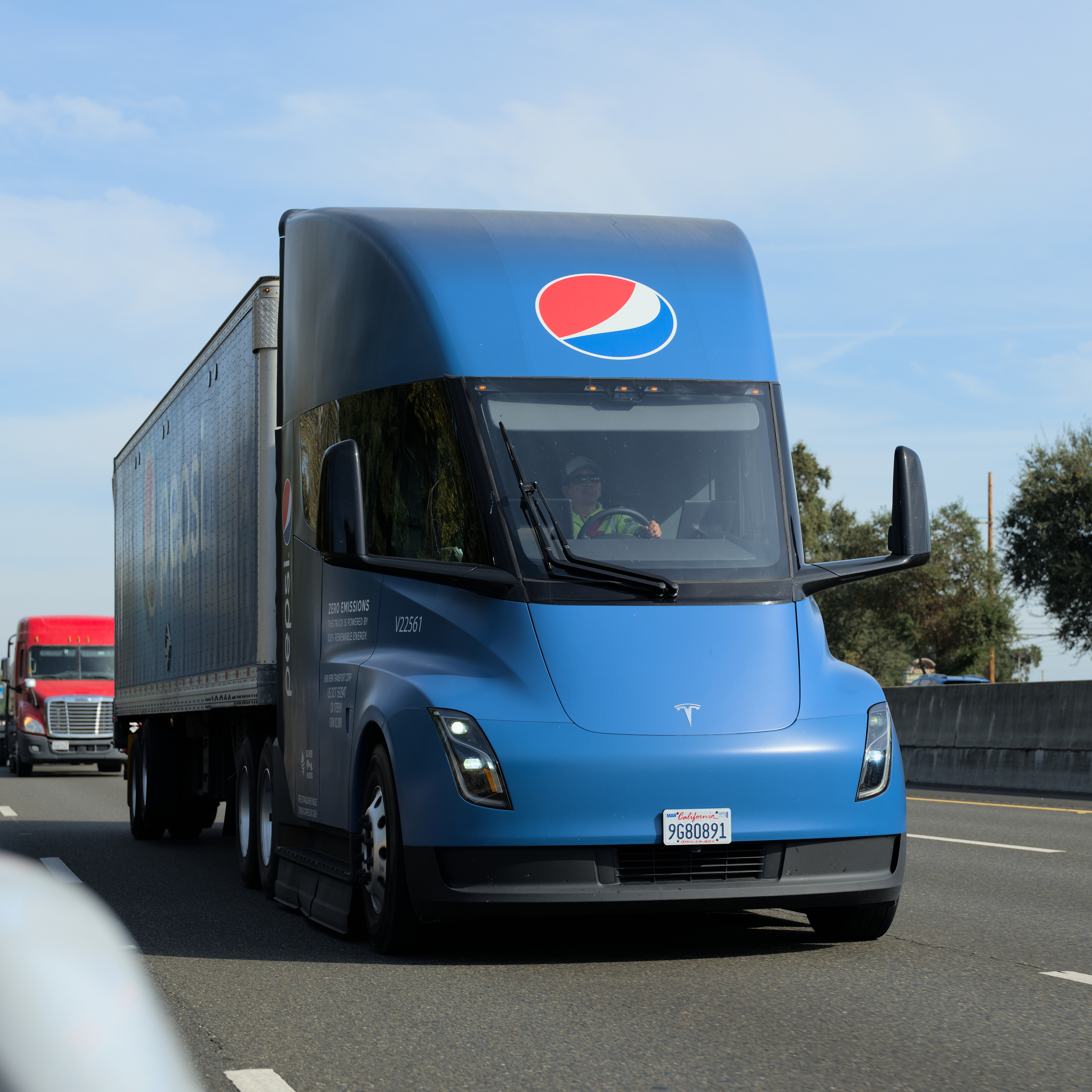
A Tesla Semi prototype operated by PepsiCo in Sacramento, California, October 2023.

The Tesla Semi is a battery electric semi-trailer truck built by Tesla, Inc. since 2022. The truck is powered by three motors, has approximately three times the power of a typical diesel semi truck, and can operate at an energy use of less than two kilowatt-hours per mile (1.2 kW⋅h/km). The Semi has two models: one is rated for 325 miles (520 km), the other for 500 miles (800 km). It can haul 45,000 lb (20-long-ton; 23-short-ton) loads.

Two concept vehicles were unveiled in November 2017. Tesla CEO Elon Musk predicted production would begin in 2019, but it began in October 2022, with initial deliveries to PepsiCo in December 2022. Production then stalled.

On April 29, 2026, Tesla announced that the first Semi had rolled off its high-volume production line in Nevada. The company targeted annual production of 50,000 trucks at the factory.

== History ==
The Semi was first mentioned in the Tesla 2016 Master Plan. In May 2017, Musk said Tesla had a working prototype that used 'a bunch' of Tesla Model 3 electric motors. As of April 2017, Jerome Guillen had been leading the Semi program. Guillen was once in charge of Freightliner's Cascadia Diesel-engine Class 8 semi, before joining Tesla to configure the Model S production line, but left the Semi program a year later to lead one of the Model 3 general assembly lines and subsequently became president of Tesla's automotive division in September 2018.

A concept prototype of the Semi was unveiled at a press conference on November 16, 2017, where Musk provided additional specifics. He claimed that the Semi would cost 20 ¢/mi (12 ¢/km) less to operate than a diesel truck if charged at a Megacharger, for which Tesla said in 2017 they could guarantee a price of 7 ¢/kWh (in the United States).

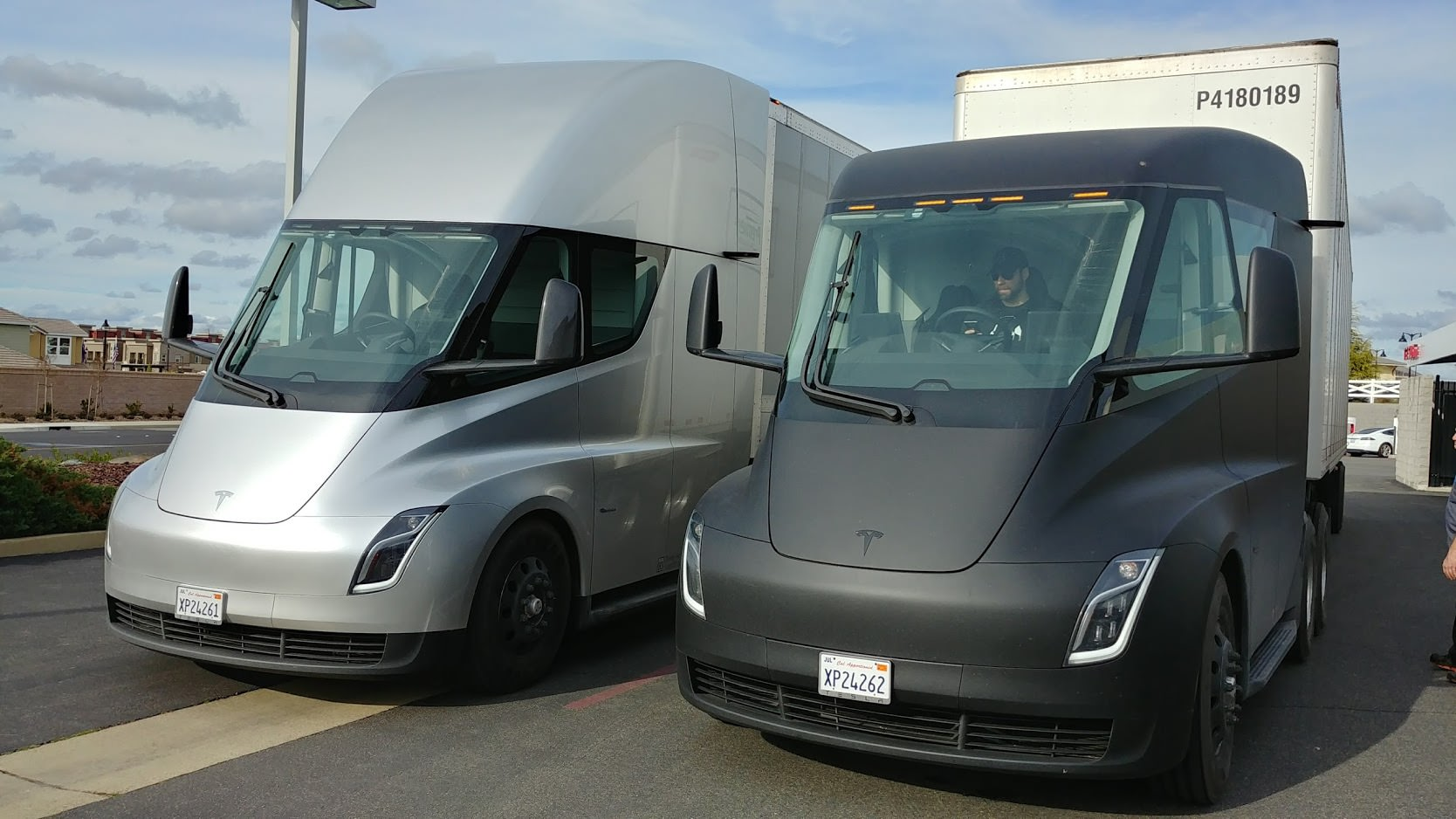
Two prototype Tesla Semis in Rocklin, California

Tesla indicated that the Semi would be equipped with Enhanced Autopilot as standard equipment, offering semi-autonomous capability, and that new technology with active safety controls on the independent motors and wheels would detect and prevent jackknifing. At the time, platooning was legal in only eight U.S. states and all required a human driver in each truck, so changes in legislation would be necessary to achieve that technology capability. The battery packs are located under the floor of the cab, between the front and driving wheels. Running empty, the long-range Semi was expected to have a range of 620 miles (997 km). In 2017, Tesla projected that the price of production versions for the 300-mile (480 km) and 500-mile (800 km) range versions would be US$150,000 and US$180,000 respectively. The company stated they would offer a Founder's Series Semi at US$200,000. By 2026, the production Semi was expected to cost about US$260,000 for the Standard Range and about US$300,000 for the Long Range version. At the Semi and Roadster unveiling event, Musk stated "Production of the semi begins in 2019, so if you order now, you get the truck in 2 years." Tesla intends to warrant the drivetrain for 1 million miles.

In 2018, Tesla announced that Semi prototypes were being tested with real cargo, hauling battery packs from Nevada to California.

The company's plans to put the Semi into production were substantially delayed. At the 2017 unveiling, production was slated to begin in 2019. In January 2020, Musk stated that a lack of battery production capability was one limiting factor for the conservative Semi production timeline, with the company choosing to use its battery supply for passenger cars instead. In January 2021, the company announced that Semi production would be delayed until the end of 2021, as the company hoped to ramp up high-volume production of its "tabless" 4680 battery cells (previewed in September 2020) to meet the demand for the Semi and other vehicles. In October 2021, Musk announced that production of the Semi would slip into 2023.

In October 2022, Musk announced that production of the 500-mile (800 km) range model had begun, with first deliveries planned for December. In November 2022, the company reported that a Semi had completed a 500-mile (800 km) drive while weighing 81,000 pounds (37,000 kg).

On December 1, 2022, Tesla began customer deliveries at an evening event hosted at the manufacturing facility in Nevada. PepsiCo received the first Semis of their large order for use with Pepsi beverage and Frito-Lay snack food transportation fleets. PepsiCo Vice President Mike O'Connell stated that the Semis can haul Frito-Lay food products for around 425 miles (684 km), but for heavier loads of sodas, the trucks will make shorter trips of around 100 miles (160 km).

In late 2023, Tesla announced plans to establish a charging network for the Semi in the southwestern US. The network is expected to cost around $100M.

As of May 2024, Walmart, Costco, Sysco, Martin Brower, and US Foods were also testing the Semi. In August 2024, third-party logistics provider NFI tested the Semi and reported an efficiency of 1.64 kWh/mi (1.02 kW⋅h/km). In October 2024, DHL reported an efficiency of 1.72 kWh/mi (1.07 kW⋅h/km) loaded with 75,000 pounds (34,000 kg) gross-combined weight over 388 miles (625 km) on a single charge.

On August 19, 2024, a Semi caught fire after a crash in Placer County, California, which closed I-80 for several hours and took a large volume of water to extinguish. A later NTSB report detailed that the truck left the roadway, struck a traffic delineator and a tree before coming to rest, where its lithium-ion battery system ignited. The driver was uninjured

In April 2025, Tesla announced plans at ACT Expo to deploy 46 public Megacharger stations by early 2027 to support broader deployment of the Semi.

On March 23, 2026, a new model of the Semi was shown with a sleeker front fascia and nearly 1,000 lb (450 kg) less weight. On April 29, serial production was announced by Tesla.

On October 27, 2026, a Tesla Semi caught fire on I-880 in Hayward, California which closed the interstate for approximately 10 hours, The cause of the fire remains under investigation

== Design ==
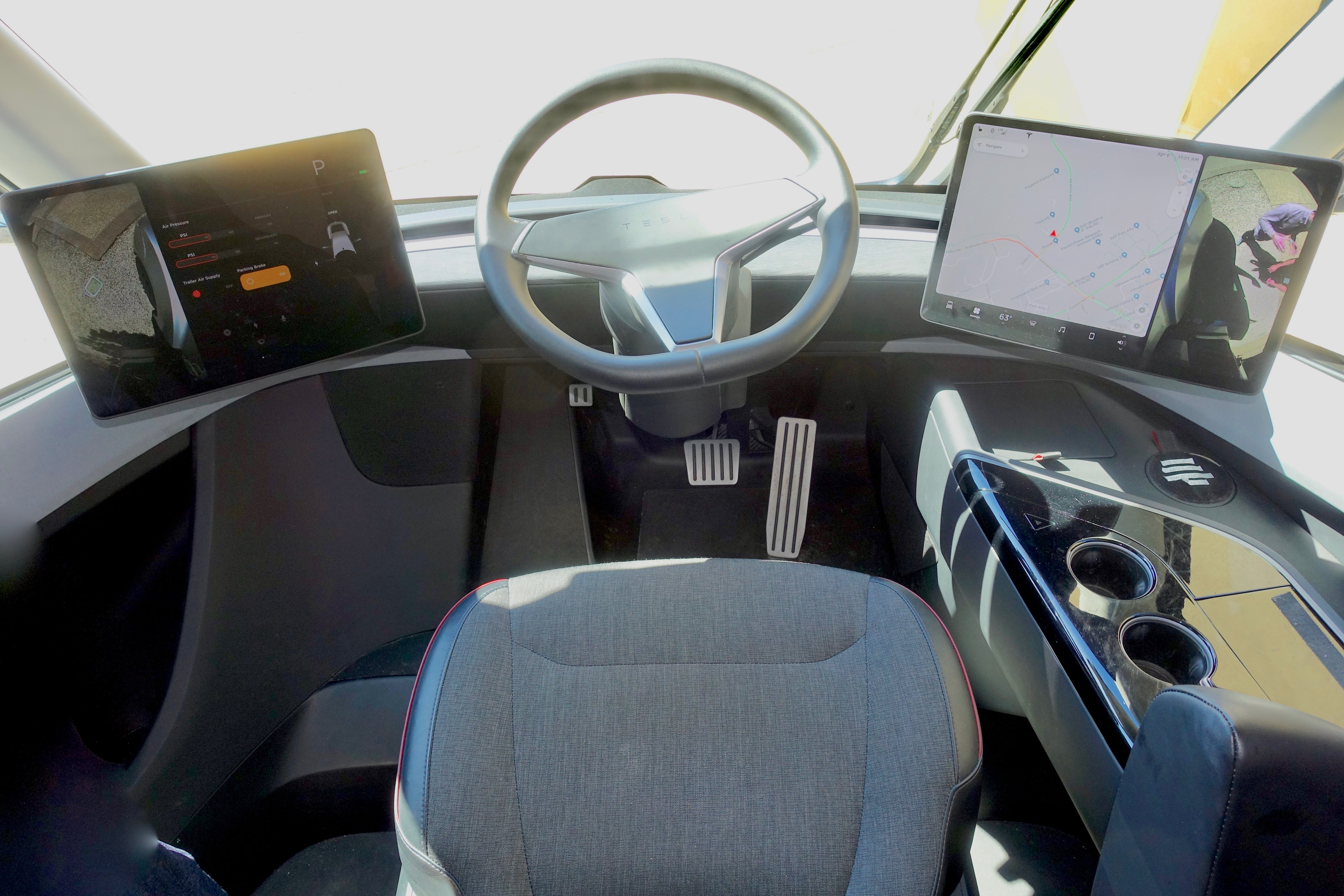
Cabin of a Semi prototype

The Semi is powered by three carbon-fiber-wrapped motors; one operates continuously at optimal efficiency, while the other two motors provide additional power for acceleration and hills. The stator and inverter are the same as in the Cybertruck.

The driver's seat is centered inside the bullet-shaped cab. The ceiling allows an adult to stand. Touchscreen displays are set on both sides of the steering wheel, with no other instrument panels. The production model has side windows that completely retract.

It has a drag coefficient of Cd=0.4.

The performance drop in cold weather is similar to diesel trucks (colder tires, etc.) Thermal management is active, routing heat to wherever it is needed (interior, battery).

Tesla has said that the Semi is equipped with cameras and sensors that could support Full Self-Driving capability. Tesla claims that its Vehicle Dynamics Control system, which modulates torque and braking at individual wheels, can prevent jackknifing, though no independent safety data on the production Semi has been published.

The Semi has a 1.2-megawatt powertrain and charging system. It uses the same 4680 battery cells with NMCA chemistry found in the Cybertruck. The battery is rated to last 1 million miles (1.6 million km). High-speed charging is supported at Tesla Megachargers. The battery is located near the ground to keep a low center of mass.

The truck supports commercial semi tires. Downhill driving uses regenerative braking, recharging the battery, without touching the brake pedal.

The truck is able to power a refrigerated trailer or other high-powered machine without a pony motor.

The cab has two rear axles. One provides maximum torque: starting to drive, and driving uphill. The second one is for efficiency during cruising, avoiding a multi-speed transmission.

It has a shorter wheelbase and a smaller battery.

The infotainment system matches Tesla's other vehicles, and supports Bluetooth phone access.

Compared to the initial version, the 2026 model offers:

- 1,000 lb (450 kg) weight reduction, in part by shifting to 48 volts
- 7% aerodynamic efficiency improvement
- Electric rather than hydraulic steering (not steer-by-wire)

== Costs ==
Semis cost under US$300,000, twice as much as a diesel truck, but $100,000 less than other battery-electric trucks. Because of a California $200,000 subsidy, California companies have placed over 1,000 Semi orders, which would double the number of battery-electric trucks serving the ports of Long Beach and Los Angeles. In the March 2026 interview, Tesla representatives said total ownership costs were nearly 20% lower than for comparable diesel trucks across the US, while energy costs were about 50% lower in California.

== Specifications ==
The Semi comes in two trims: Long Range and Standard Range.

=== Both trims ===
- Battery: 4680 cell format, NMCA chemistry
- Electric steering assist
- Strengthened Cybertruck actuators
- 48 volt architecture (supports 12-volt accessories)
- Motors: Three independent motors on rear axles, 1 unit for efficiency, 2 acceleration units for torque
- Energy consumption: 1.7 kW⋅h/mi (106 kWh/100 km)
- Charge speed: ~60% of range in 30 minutes
- Peak Charging speed: 1.2 MW
- Charge type: MCS 3.2
- ePTO (electric power take off): ~25 kW

=== Long Range ===
- Range: ~500 miles (805 km) at 82k lb gross combination weight
- Battery: 822 kWh
- Curb weight: 23,000 lb (10,433 kg)
- Peak Motor Output: 800 kW / 1,072 hp

=== Standard Range ===
- Range: ~325 miles (523 km) at 82k lb gross combination weight
- Battery: 548 kWh
- Curb weight: <20,000 lb (9,072 kg)
- Peak Motor Output: 525 kW / 704 hp

== Prototype results ==
Prior to the 2026 production release:

- The prototype fleet (a few hundred trucks) drove more than 13.5 million miles (21.7 million km).
- The busiest truck covered 440,000 miles (710,000 km).
- Fleet uptime was 95%.
- 75-80% of Semi breakdowns were resolved and returned to the customer in less than 24 hours, with more than half returned within 30 minutes.

== See also ==
- Megawatt Charging System – Direct current (DC) charging system for large battery electric vehicles
