= Megawatt Charging System =

Electric vehicle charging connector for commercial vehicles

Megawatt Charging System connector
- Prototype v3.2 MCS connector; there are two primary power (DC) pins, four communications/detection (C) pins, and one protective earth (PE) pin.
- Type: Electric vehicle charging

Production history
- Designer: MCS (former HPCCV) working group, CharIN
- Designed: 2020‒2022
- Standardized: 2026

General specifications
- Pins: 7
- Connector: MCS IEC-63379

Electrical
- Signal: DC IEC-61851-23
- Earth: Dedicated pin
- Max. voltage: 1,250 V
- Max. current: 3,000 A

Data
- Data signal: ISO 15118-20

The Megawatt Charging System (MCS) is a charging connector under development for large battery electric vehicles. The connector will be rated for charging at a maximum rate of 3.75 megawatts (3,000 amps at 1,250 volts direct current (DC)).

The MCS connector is being advanced by the CharIN organization, with aspirations that it become a worldwide standard charging connector for large and medium commercial vehicles.

== History ==
A Charging Interface Initiative e.V. (CharIN) task force was formed by industry actors in March 2018, with the purpose to "define a new commercial vehicle high power charging standard to maximize customer flexibility." CharIN had previously developed the Combined Charging System (CCS) specification. From early 2018 until late 2019, the abbreviation HPCCV (High Power Charging for Commercial Vehicles) was used, following the name of the CharIN consortium taskforce. The purpose statement was later revised to "work out requirements for a new commercial vehicle high power charging solution to maximize customer flexibility when using fully electric commercial vehicles. The scope of the technical recommendation is to be limited to the connector, and any related requirements for the EVSE, the vehicle, communication, and related hardware."

The HPCCV held a meeting in September 2018 to build consensus on proposed requirements, and the CharIN Board of Management approved a set of consensus requirements in November 2018. Five companies submitted candidate designs to meet the requirements: Tesla, Electrify America, ABB, paXos, and Stäubli. HPCCV selected a charging plug and socket design in May 2019, which was endorsed by CharIN leadership in September 2019. The version 1.0 HPCCV connector had a triangular shape and round power pins, but the design required further development as it was not finger-proof (safe from accidental contact with the power pins).

Approximate drawing of previous version 2 draft outlet; DC± would have been carried via two "tuning fork" contacts

A test of seven vehicle inlets and eleven connectors was held at the US National Renewable Energy Laboratory (NREL) in September 2020. The prototype hardware represented designs from seven different manufacturers, and six additional manufacturers participated virtually. Criteria evaluated included fit/compatibility, ergonomics, and thermal performance. Evaluations at maximum current (3000 A) were conducted with cooling of both the inlet and the connector; for connector cooling only, current was limited to 1000 A, and without cooling, current was limited to 350 A. Versions 2.0 through 2.4 of the MCS connector used "hairpin" shaped contacts, but it was later changed to version 3.0 through 3.2, which returned to the triangular shape with larger pins and longer protective sheaths to prevent accidental contact.

The task force had anticipated that a requirements and specification document would be published by the end of 2021. In August 2021, prototype connectors were tested at up to 3.75 megawatts. MCS connector version 3.2 was adopted in December 2021. CharIN intends to complete the specification document by 2024, which is planned to be in a state that is ready to be adopted by ISO and IEC as a global standard. In preparation, SAE International began developing the draft MCS standards into the J3271 requirements in December 2021; in parallel, the IEC began developing standard 63379 in Spring 2021.

The final standard had been expected to be resolved in 2025 with the publication of the system standard documents IEC 61851-23-3 and SAE J3271. (SAE J3271 has been published in March 2025) The charging communication is implemented by using automotive Single-pair Ethernet 10BASE-T1S (according IEEE 802.3-2022 and ISO 15118-10) as physical layer and ISO 15118-20 as application protocol (the latter allows state of the art cybersecurity implementation and smart charging services like V2G (bidirectional charging) and the automated billing & authentication method Plug & Charge (PnC)).

The MCS connector system has been released as IEC 63379 in version 1.0 in February 2026. The remaining parts, specifically the low-level-communication IEC-61851-23, are expected to be resolved until the end of the year. The resolution process includes further amendments to the physical layer ISO 15118-10 and to the high-level protocol ISO 15118-20.

=== Specific implementations ===
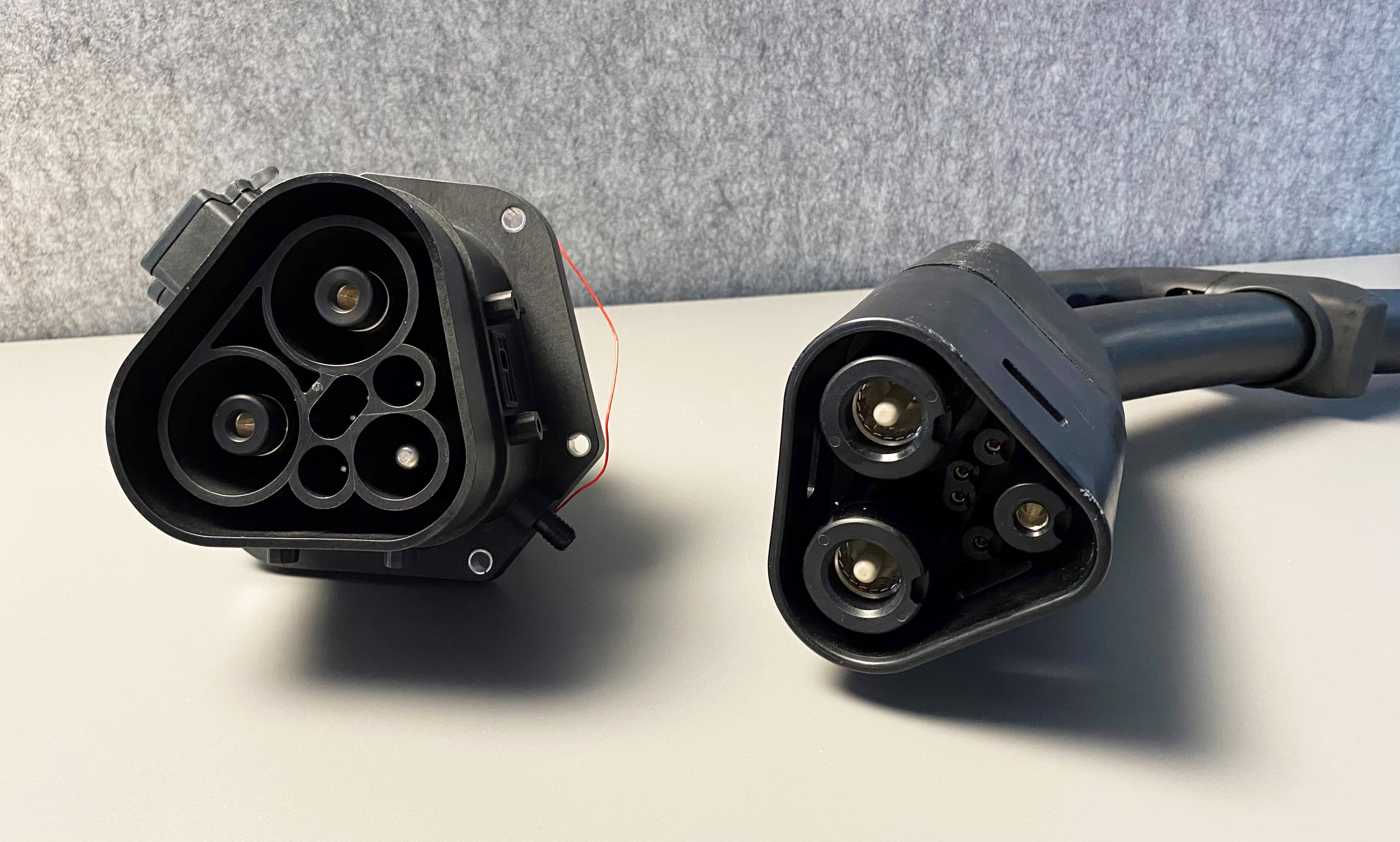
The Megawatt Charging System (MCS) from Stäubli is built in accordance with CharIN task force specifications and focuses on exceptional robustness and user‑friendly handling.

Lilium GmbH announced in October 2021 that forthcoming VTOL Lilium Jets would be fitted with MCS for charging. Charging stations with MCS connectors will be delivered by ABB in 2024. ABB charging stations have been operated at interoperability testing events.

Three truck charging stations using a pre-standardized version of MCS will be built and operated in the Swedish project E-Charge. The chargers will be installed on three different locations in southern Sweden and will be used by four authentic logistics flows during a year's time starting in Q1 2024. The electric trucks will be provided by Scania and Volvo while the chargers will be provided by ABB.

The German national project „Hochleistungsladen im Lkw-Fernverkehr“, commonly referred to as the HoLa project (from German Hochleistungs-Ladepark, literally high capacity charging park for the charging sites), will build four new truck charging stations along the Autobahn A2 from Berlin, Germany to Duisburg, Germany. Each station will be equipped initially with two 600 kW stations starting in June 2022, and will be upgraded to 1 megawatt using MCS in fall 2023. The chargers will be built by Heliox.

In May 2026, Germany's Federal Ministry of Transport (BMV) announced the launch of a USD 1.16 billion program to expand electric truck charging infrastructure, including support for MCS technology for high-power charging of heavy-duty vehicles.

In January 2023 an early Tesla Semi was spotted with version 2 of the MCS charging port.

Kempower was expected to deliver the first MCS chargers in late 2024 to a site in Sweden.

ABB will deliver charging stations with 1200 kW in 2025 which will be used in the pilot projects as planned in 2024.

Pilot projects started in 2024. In March, an MAN eTruck was charged with 1000 A at 700 kW at an ABB charging station. In April, a Mercedes-Benz eActross 600 was charged with 1250 A at 1000 kW at an ABB charging station. In April, two eActross were delivered to the test client Contargo. Contargo had announced to build its own network of truck fast chargers, specifically at its company sites in Duisburg, Voerde-Emmelsum, Emmerich, Frankfurt-Ost, Industriepark Frankfurt-Höchst, Gustavsburg, Hamburg, Karlsruhe, Koblenz, Ludwigshafen, Mannheim, Neuss, Weil am Rhein and Wörth. In June, Milence opened its first truck charging park in the port of Antwerpen-Brügge, not including an MCS plug however. In June, Shell opened a public truck fast charger with CCS and MCS at its ETCA campus in Amsterdam. In July, E.On and MAN announced that they would set up publicly available fast chargers for trucks at MAN service centers by the end of 2025, with the first going into operation in 2024. 125 of the 170 locations are in Germany, the others in Austria, Great Britain, Denmark, Italy, Poland, the Czech Republic and Hungary. Here, too, they are starting with 400 kW CCS planning to convert to MCS later.

Tesla announced at ACT Expo 2025 plans to develop a public, 46-station Megacharger network using a megawatt charging system to support broader deployments of the Tesla Semi.

A two-plug MCS charger (2 MW) started in Forsand (Norway) in 2026 for the Rygerlys ferry servicing the Lyse fjord.

== Design requirements ==
Key requirements include:

- Single conductive plug
- Maximum of 1250 V DC and 3000 A
- 1500V DC connector maximum
- Differential PLC + ISO/IEC 15118 – 20 (ISO 15118-20 Communication Protocols allows bi-directional energy flow for vehicle-to-grid (V2G), Smart Charging, Encrypted Communication, Plug ‘n Charge, Automated Charging)
- Touch Safe (UL2251)
- On-handle software-interpreted override switch
- Adherence to OSHA / ADA (or local equivalent) standards (dictates sizes using anthropometric data and masses using ergonomic data)
- FCC Class A EMI (or local equivalent)
- Located on left side of the vehicle, hip height (ergonomics)
- Capable of being automated
- UL / NRTL certified
- Cyber-Secure
- V2X (bi-directional) based on ISO15118-20

MCS is intended for Class 6, 7, and 8 commercial vehicles, initially with a primary focus on large trucks and buses, but potential MCS applications to the Aeronautics industry (e-VTOL, e-Planes, etc...) and Marine Industry (Tug-boats, e-Ferries, River Cargo vessels, etc...) exist. For road vehicles, the vehicle inlet should be placed on the left side of the vehicle (driver's side in North America), between the front and rear axles.

A CCS Combo 1/Combo 2/SAE J3068 or ChaoJi inlet may also be fitted to the vehicle for compatibility and AC charging. Black & Veatch have designed prototype layout requirements for vehicle charging lanes.

== See also ==
- Tesla Megacharger
- Ultra-ChaoJi
