= Jérôme Guillen =

Automotive manufacturing executive

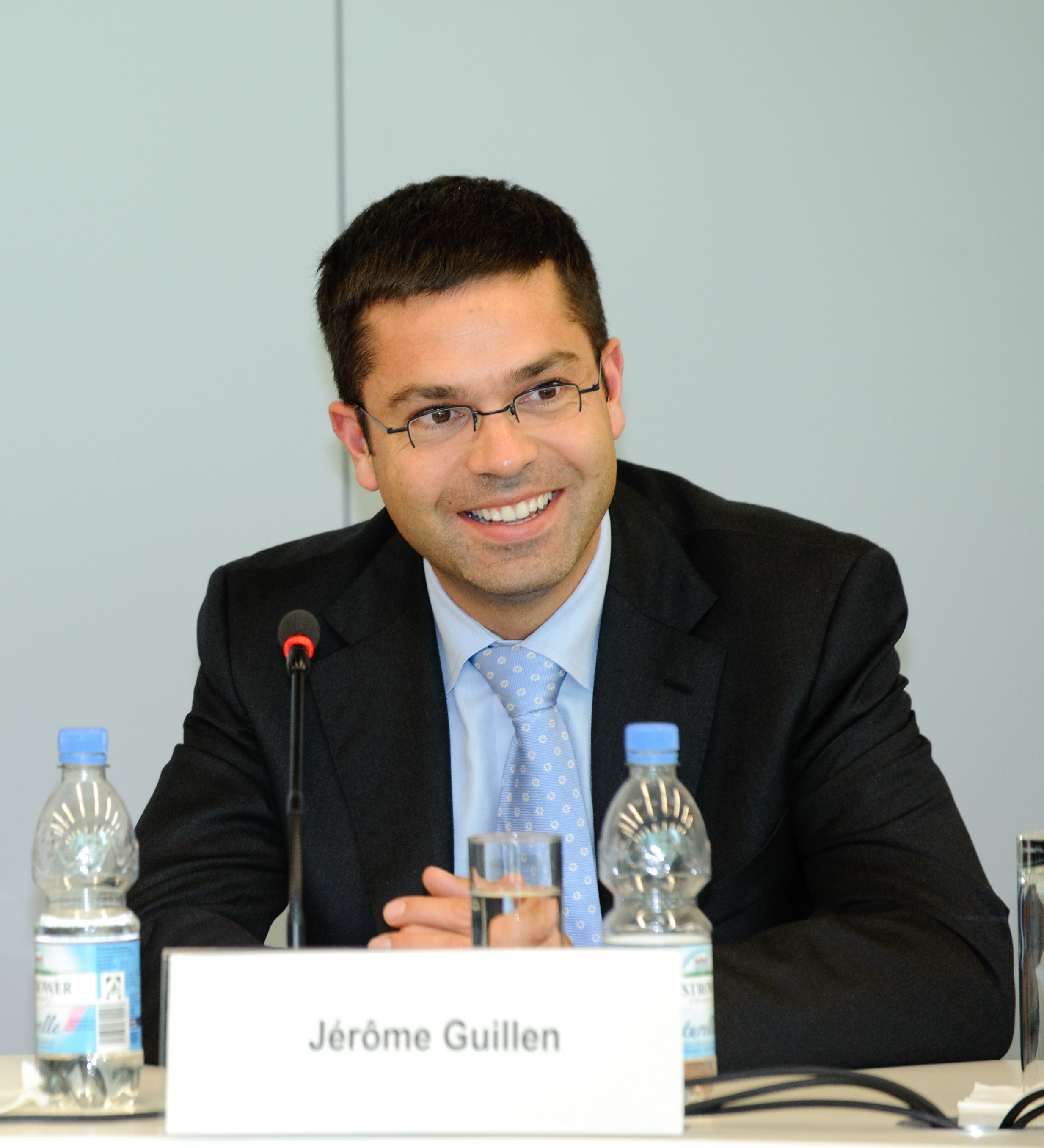
- Guillen in 2010
- Born: Jérôme M. Guillen; 1972 (age 53–54); Cavaillon, Vaucluse, France
- Education: ENSTA Paris; University of Michigan
- Occupation: Automotive manufacturing
- Years active: 2003‒
- Known for: Tesla Semi

Jérôme M. Guillen is a transport executive working in automotive manufacturing. He holds a Doctor of Engineering from the University of Michigan and has worked for Freightliner Trucks, Daimler AG and Tesla, Inc. Guillen previously studied in France at ENSTA Paris. Guillen worked at Tesla, Inc. for ten years between 2010 and 2021, including as President of Automotive, having previously led both the Tesla Model S and Tesla Semi manufacturing programmes.

== Education ==
Guillen was born in 1972 in Cavaillon, Vaucluse, France and grew up near Avignon. He attended the Ismaël-Dauphin school in Cavaillon, followed by the Lycée Thiers secondary school in Marseille.

Guillen's studies at ENSTA Paris included an Erasmus Programme year abroad studying at the engineering department of the Technical University of Madrid (Escuela Técnica Superior de Ingenieros Industriales, ETSII), resulting in dual degrees; BS Mechanical Engineering from ENSTA in 1993 and BS Nuclear Engineering from ETSII in 1994.

Guillen completed his PhD in Mechanical Engineering at the University of Michigan in 1999. Upon graduation, Guillen was hired by McKinsey & Company.

== Career ==
=== McKinsey & Co (1999-2003) ===
Upon graduation, Guillen was hired by McKinsey & Company.

=== Daimler (2003-2010) ===
Beginning in 2003 Guillen worked at Freightliner Trucks, reporting to the company CEO Rainer Schmueckle. He was later promoted to General Manager of New Product Development. Guillen was project leader for the Freightliner Cascadia program, which was plagued with repeated recalls of hundreds of thousands of vehicles for dozens of reasons including multiple brake system design failures, and wiring systems designed and installed backwards.

On 7 July 2007 Guillen was approached by Dieter Zetsche of Freightliner's parent company, Daimler, and starting in September 2007 became Daimler's Director of Business Innovation. During 2010 Guillen launched the car2go service for Daimler. By October 2010, the Business Innovation unit of Daimler, as headed by Guillen, was profitable and self-funding.

=== Tesla (2010-2021) ===
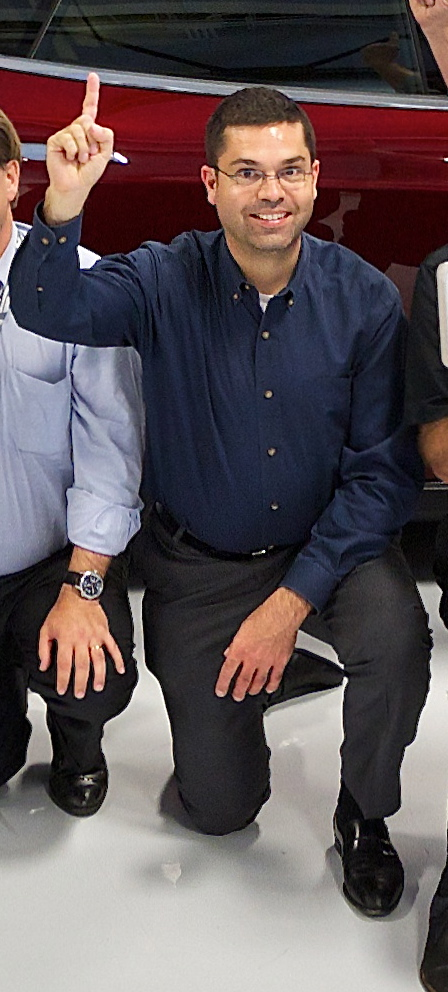
Jérôme Guillen, in front of the first 2012-Tesla Model S (VIN 1), bought by Steve Jurvetson

In November 2010, Guillen moved to work for Tesla Motors. Whilst demonstrating the Tesla Model X at the North American International Auto Show in January 2013, Guillen stated that he did not regret the move to Tesla in California, but did miss the German dishes of Käsespätzle and Maultaschen, plus visiting the Stuttgart Ballet. By April 2015 Guillen was receiving a remuneration of $4.5 million per year.

In a 2013 interview, Guillen discussed "BlueStar" (codename for the Tesla Model 3 project), stating that Tesla was expecting to produce 400,000 cars per year. During ramp up of the Tesla Model 3 in June 2018, Elon Musk stated who should be contacted to offer help, with Guillen listed as overseeing General Assembly 4 (GA4):

Wherever you are in the company, if you feel you can help out in any of those areas, please check in with Jat Dhillon on GA3, Jérôme Guillen on GA4 and Omead on EoL and JB Straubel or Chris Lister on Module Zone 4.

— Elon Musk, 15 June 2018,

Roles of Jérôme Guillen whilst at Tesla
From	To	Role
2010-11	2013-04	Tesla Model S Program Director
2012-01		Acting Vice-President, Vehicle Engineering
2013-04	2015-03	Vice-President, Worldwide Sales and Service
2016-07		Leading Tesla Semi-truck program
2018-06		Leading Tesla Model 3, General Assembly 4
2018-09	2021-03	President, Automotive
2021-03	2021-06	President, Tesla Heavy Trucking

Guillen left Tesla in the role of president, Tesla Heavy Trucking on 3 June 2021.
