= Robotaxi =

Taxi without a human driver

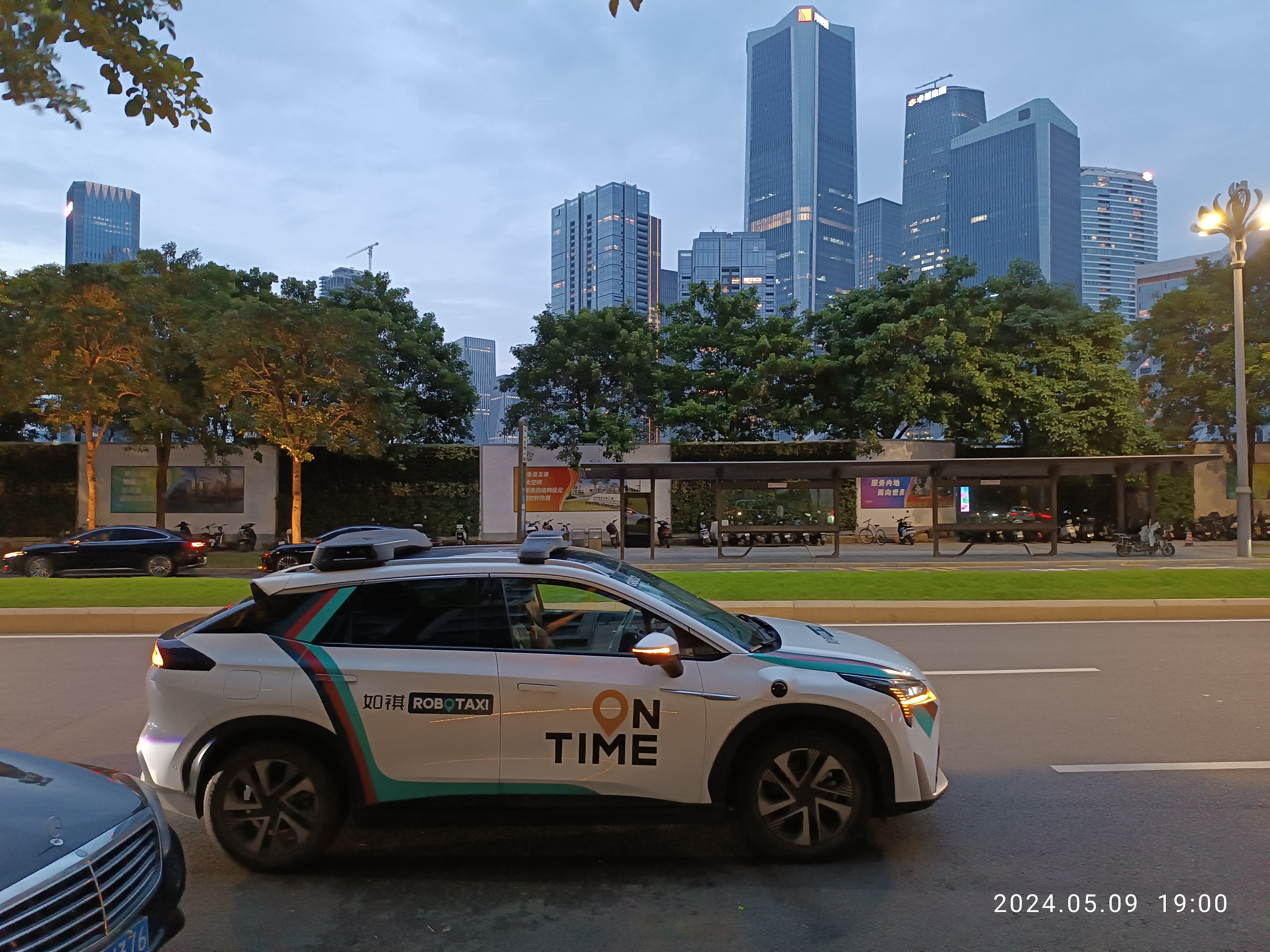
A robotaxi in Shenzhen, China

A robotaxi, also known as robot taxi, robo-taxi, self-driving taxi or driverless taxi, is an autonomous car (SAE automation level 4 or 5) operated for a ridesharing company.

Consultancy firms predict that robotaxis operated in an autonomous mobility on demand (AMoD) service could be a large application of autonomous cars at scale, especially in urban areas. Market forecasts suggest they have a positive impact on congestion and parking over private cars, while some firms such as Kearney predict a negative impact due to induced demand. Studies on the impacts on road safety are mixed, with crash rates higher than humans in certain pilots.

Robotaxis could also reduce urban pollution and energy consumption, since less weight and range is necessary compared to individually owned vehicles. The expected reduction in number of vehicles means less embodied energy; however energy consumption for redistribution of empty vehicles must be taken into account. Robotaxis would reduce operating costs by eliminating the need for a human driver, which might make it an affordable form of transportation and increase the popularity of transportation-as-a-service (TaaS) as opposed to individual car ownership.

Such developments could lead to job destruction and new challenges concerning operator liabilities. In 2023, some robotaxis caused congestion when they blocked roads due to lost cellular connectivity, and others failed to properly yield to emergency vehicles. As of 2026, there has been one fatality associated with a robotaxi, a pedestrian who was hit by an Uber test vehicle in 2018.

Predictions of the widespread and rapid introduction of robotaxis – by as early as 2018 – have not yet been realized. Several companies provide robotaxi services of varying degrees of automation in parts of the world. As of 2025, the number and scope of these services is rapidly expanding, but they still all operate at a financial loss. An American Automobile Association survey in 2025 said that only 13% of respondents would trust a self-driving vehicle.

== Status ==
=== Services ===
Robotaxi service by country Current service by American companies Current service by Chinese companies Future service by American companies Future service by Chinese companies

Companies with active robotaxi services include Avride, Baidu, Motional, Pony.ai, Tesla, Waymo, WeRide and Zoox.

=== Vehicle costs ===
So far, most trials have involved specially modified passenger cars with space for two or four passengers sitting in the back seats behind a partition. LIDAR, cameras and other sensors have been used on most vehicles. The cost of early vehicles was estimated in 2020 at up to US$400,000 due to custom manufacture and specialized sensors. However, the prices of some components such as LIDAR have fallen significantly. In January 2021, Waymo stated its costs were approximately $180,000 per vehicle, and its operating cost at $0.30 per mile (~$0.19 per km), well below Uber and Lyft, but this excludes the cost of fleet technicians and customer support. Baidu announced in June 2021 it would start producing purpose-built robotaxi vehicles for 500,000 yuan ($77,665) each under the Apollo brand. Tesla has discussed a sub-$25,000 vehicle omitting the use of sensors and solely relying on camera data and plans to enter the market with a purpose-built vehicle for Robotaxi service, the Tesla Cybercab, in 2026.

=== Passenger tests ===
Several companies are testing robotaxi services, especially in the United States and in China. All operate only in a geo-fenced area. Service areas for robotaxis, also known as the Objective Design Domain (ODD), are specially designated zones where robotaxis can provide service.

Separate to these efforts have been trials of larger shared autonomous vehicles on fixed routes with designated stops, able to carry between 6 and 10 passengers. These shuttle buses have thus far operated at low speeds.

=== Current obstacles to robotaxis ===
At present, it is not only technical issues that hinder the widespread use of robotaxis, but also social issues. Consumers' concerns about the reliability and safety of self-driving taxis are an obstacle to broad acceptance. For example, system failures during the service process and the perception of the risks of an accident reduces the number of users. In addition, consumers have doubts about whether the robotaxi can cope with complex urban environments or severe weather conditions.

=== Licenses ===
In February 2018, Arizona granted Waymo a Transportation Network Company permit.

In February 2022, the California Public Utilities Commission (CPUC) issued Drivered Deployment permits to Cruise and Waymo to allow passenger service in autonomous vehicles with a safety driver present in the vehicle. These carriers must hold a valid California Department of Motor Vehicles (DMV) Deployment permit and meet the requirements of the CPUC Drivered Deployment program. In June 2022, Cruise received approval to operate a commercial robotaxi service in San Francisco.

In April 2022, China gave Baidu and Pony.ai its first permits to deploy robotaxis without safety drivers on open roads within a 23 square mile area in the Beijing Economic-Technological Development Area.

In August 2023, the CPUC approved granting additional operating authority for Cruise LLC and Waymo LLC to conduct commercial passenger service using vehicles without safety drivers in San Francisco. The approval includes the ability for both companies to charge fares for rides at any time of day. California subsequently enlarged Waymo's permitted operating area to specified San Francisco Bay Area localities, to airports and freeways in the area, and, in late 2025, to the entire Bay Area including the North and East Bay and, after securing an additional permit, to Sacramento, California.

== History ==
=== First trials ===
On 18 August 2016, Uber CEO Travis Kalanick announced the company would be opening their autonomous taxi fleet to the public in Pittsburgh, Pennsylvania in the next few weeks. In a race to be first, NuTonomy surprise-launched their robotaxi service a week later, though only to select members of the public through a closed-invitation and in a limited district in Singapore. Uber proceeded with their public launch in September 2016, with customers being assigned human or autonomous cars interchangeably when requesting rides through the regular Uber app in Pittsburgh.

NuTonomy later signed three significant partnerships to develop its robotaxi service: with Grab, Uber’s rival in Southeast Asia, with Groupe PSA, which is supposed to provide the company with Peugeot 3008 SUVs and the last one with Lyft to launch a robotaxi service in Boston, Massachusetts.

In August 2017, Cruise Automation, a self-driving startup acquired by General Motors in 2016, launched the beta version of a robotaxi service for its employees in San Francisco using a fleet of 46 Chevrolet Bolt EVs.

=== Testing and revenue service timeline ===
Trials listed have a safety driver unless otherwise indicated. The commencement of a trial does not mean it is still active.

- August 2016 – NuTonomy launched a closed-invite autonomous taxi service using a fleet of 6 modified Renault Zoes and Mitsubishi i-MiEVs, limited to operating within their office's district in Singapore. Human drivers were seated in the front for safety.
- September 2016 – Uber launched its autonomous taxi service in Pittsburgh, Pennsylvania, with an initial fleet size of 14 vehicles, with a planned fleet of around 100 cars. This was open to the public through the regular Uber app, with customers being assigned human or autonomous cars interchangeably. Human drivers were seated in the front for safety. The autonomous area covered 31 square kilometers of the downtown core of Pittsburgh.
- March 2017 – An Uber self-driving car was hit and flipped on its side by another vehicle that failed to yield. In October 2017, Uber started using only one safety driver.
- April 2017 – Waymo started large scale robotaxi tests in a geo-fenced suburb of Phoenix, Arizona with a driver monitoring each vehicle. The service area was about 100 square miles (260 km^{2}). In November 2017, some driverless testing began. Commercial operations began in November 2019.
- August 2017 – Cruise Automation launched the beta version robotaxi service for 250 employees (10% of its staff) in San Francisco using a fleet of 46 vehicles.
- March 2018 – A woman attempting to cross a street in Tempe, Arizona at night was struck and killed by an Uber vehicle while the onboard safety driver was watching videos. Uber later restarted testing, but only during daylight hours and at slower speeds.
- August 2018 – Yandex began a trial with two vehicles in Innopolis, Russia.
- December 2018 – Waymo started a self-driving taxi service, dubbed Waymo One, for paying customers in Arizona.
- April 2019 – Pony.ai launched a pilot system for employees and invited affiliates, serving pre-defined pickup points and covering 50 km^{2} (19 sq mi) in Guangzhou, China.
- November 2019 – WeRide RoboTaxi began a pilot service with 20 vehicles in Guangzhou and Huangpu, China, over an area of 144.65 km^{2} (55.85 sq mi).
- November 2019 – Pony.ai started a three-month trial in Irvine, California with 10 cars and stops for pickup and drop off.
- April 2020 – Baidu opened its trial of 45 vehicles in Changsha, China to public users for free trips, serving 100 designated spots on a set 135 km (84 mi) network. Services operated from 9:20 am to 4:40 pm with a safety-driver and a "navigator", allowing space for two passengers in the back.
- June 2020 – DiDi robotaxi service began operation in Shanghai, China, in an area that covered Shanghai's Automobile Exhibition Center, the local business districts, subway stations and hotels in the downtown area.
- August 2020 – Baidu began offering free trips, with app bookings, on its trial in Cangzhou, China, which served 55 designated spots over pre-defined routes.
- December 2020 – AutoX (which is backed by Alibaba Group) launched a non-public trial of driverless robotaxis in Shenzhen, China, with 25 vehicles. The service was then opened to the public in January 2021.
- February 2021 – Waymo One began limited robotaxi service in a number of suburbs of San Francisco for a selection of its own employees. In August 2021, the public was invited to apply to use the service with limited locations. A safety driver was present in each vehicle. The number of vehicles involved has not been disclosed.
- May 2021 – Baidu commenced a commercial robotaxi service with ten Apollo Go vehicles in a 3 km^{2} (1.2 sq mi) area with eight pickup and drop-off stops, in Shougang Park in western Beijing, China.
- July 2021 – Baidu opened a pilot program to the public in Guangzhou with a fleet of 30 sedans serving 60 sq mi (160 km^{2}) in the Huangpu district. 200 designated spots were served between 9:30 am and 11 pm every day.
- July 2021 – DeepRoute.ai began a free-of-charge trial with 20 vehicles in downtown Shenzhen, serving 100 pickup and dropoff locations.
- February 2022 – Cruise opened its driverless cars in San Francisco to the public.
- February 2023 – Zoox, the self-driving startup owned by Amazon, carried passengers in its robotaxi for the first time in Foster City, California.
- August 2023 – Waymo and Cruise were authorized by the US CPUC to collect fares for driverless rides in San Francisco.
- July 2024 – In Wuhan, China, Baidu's attempts at commercializing Apollo Go robotaxis received massive attention from social media. Base fares started as low as 4 Chinese yuan (0.55 USD), compared to 18 yuan (2.48 USD) for a human-driven taxi. The rapid adoption of driverless taxis rattled China's gig economy workforce. However, their popularity boosted Baidu's shares.
- August 2024 – In most areas of Wuhan, Baidu’s Apollo Go robotaxis could now operate fully autonomously without safety personnel on board. The company recorded 899,000 rides in the second quarter of 2024, bringing the total number of rides to 7 million as of 28 July 2024.

== Notable commercial ventures ==
=== Baidu Apollo ===
In September 2019, Baidu's autonomous driving unit Apollo launched Apollo Go robotaxi service, with an initial fleet of 45 autonomous vehicles. Apollo Go has since expanded to more than 10 Chinese cities.

In August 2022, Baidu secured the first permits in China to deploy fully driverless taxis in the cities of Wuhan and Chongqing.

In May 2024, Baidu unveiled the Apollo ADFM, claimed to be the world's first Level 4 autonomous driving foundation model, along with the sixth-generation Apollo Go robotaxi, which can be produced for under $30,000. The company also said by April 2024, Apollo had accumulated over 100 million kilometers of autonomous driving without major accidents.

In August 2024, Apollo Go had deployed 400 robotaxis operating fully autonomously without safety personnel on board in Wuhan, offering 24/7 service to 9 million residents. Baidu aimed for Apollo Go to achieve operational unit breakeven in Wuhan by the end of 2024.

=== GM Cruise ===
In January 2020, GM subsidiary Cruise exhibited the Cruise Origin, a Level 4–5 driverless vehicle, intended to be used for a ride hailing service.

In February 2022, Cruise started driverless taxi service in San Francisco. Also in February 2022, Cruise petitioned U.S. regulators (NHTSA) for permission to build and deploy a self-driving vehicle without human controls. As of April 2022, the petition was pending.

In April 2022, their partner Honda unveiled its Level 4 mobility service partners to roll out in central Tokyo, Japan in the mid-2020s using the Cruise Origin.

Autonomously operated Cruise vehicles may interfere with emergency vehicles; at least one had collided with a fire truck.

On 2 October 2023, a Cruise vehicle operating autonomously and without driver supervision collided with a pedestrian. Instead of stopping immediately, the vehicle misidentified the collision mechanics and presumed it was crashed into from the side. Consequently, the vehicle proceeded to drag the pedestrian under the car for 20 ft (6.1 m) until it came to a stop on the side of the road. As both the response of the vehicle was deemed unacceptable and the company appears to have withheld details of the crash from regulators, California regulators revoked the license to operate these cars. Cruise recalled all of its 950 vehicles in November 2023.

These decisions were enacted in parallel with the exposure of safety risks, identified earlier within the Cruise company, regarding proper vehicle behavior around children and around construction sites.

=== Tesla ===
Tesla's CEO Elon Musk has predicted since 2019 that Tesla would have robotaxis on the road within years. He announced the plans for Tesla's robotaxi on 10 October 2024. During that event, Tesla demonstrated two new vehicles, the two-seater Tesla Cybercab and the 14-seater (plus standing room) Tesla Robovan, which can carry up to 20 passengers. The company also reiterated that all of their other models of cars and pickup trucks would be usable as robotaxis after a software update and regulatory approval, which they expected at the earliest in California and Texas in 2025.

On 22 June 2025, Tesla launched their commercial taxi service Tesla Robotaxi to a small group of invited users in Austin, Texas. Except for having Robotaxi written on the front doors, Tesla said the vehicles were be unmodified cars from their factory. Rides were priced at a flat rate of $4.20 within a geofenced area. While no one was in the driver's seat, a Tesla employee was still present in the front passenger seat for safety reasons.

In January 2026, the service began to integrate unsupervised vehicles into its fleet in a limited manner, and stated it planned to expand to seven additional cities in the first half of 2026. In April 2026, the service expanded to Dallas and Houston in Texas with unsupervised vehicles. In July 2026, the service expanded to Miami, Orlando, and Tampa with unsupervised vehicles outside of Texas for the first time.

In September 2026, the service began to rollout their purpose built vehicle, the Tesla Cybercab. This vehicle features no manual controls and only two seats with the goal of optimizing production and operational costs. Cybercab rollout initially began in Austin with plans to expand to additional cities within their network in the near future.

=== Uber Advanced Technology Group ===
Uber began development of self-driving vehicles in early 2015. In September 2016, the company started a trial allowing public users of its ride-hailing service in Pittsburgh to order robotaxis from a fleet of 14 modified Ford Fusions. The test extended to San Francisco with modified Volvo XC90s before being relocated to Tempe, Arizona in February 2017.

In March 2017, one of Uber's robotaxis crashed in self-driving mode in Arizona, which led the company to suspend its tests before resuming them a few days later. In March 2018, Uber paused self-driving vehicle testing after the death of Elaine Herzberg in Tempe, Arizona, a pedestrian struck by an Uber vehicle while attempting to cross the street, while the onboard safety engineer was watching videos. Uber settled with the victim's family.

In January 2021, Uber sold its self driving division, Advanced Technologies Group (ATG), to Aurora Innovation for $4 billion while also investing $400 million into Aurora for a 26% ownership stake.

=== Waymo ===
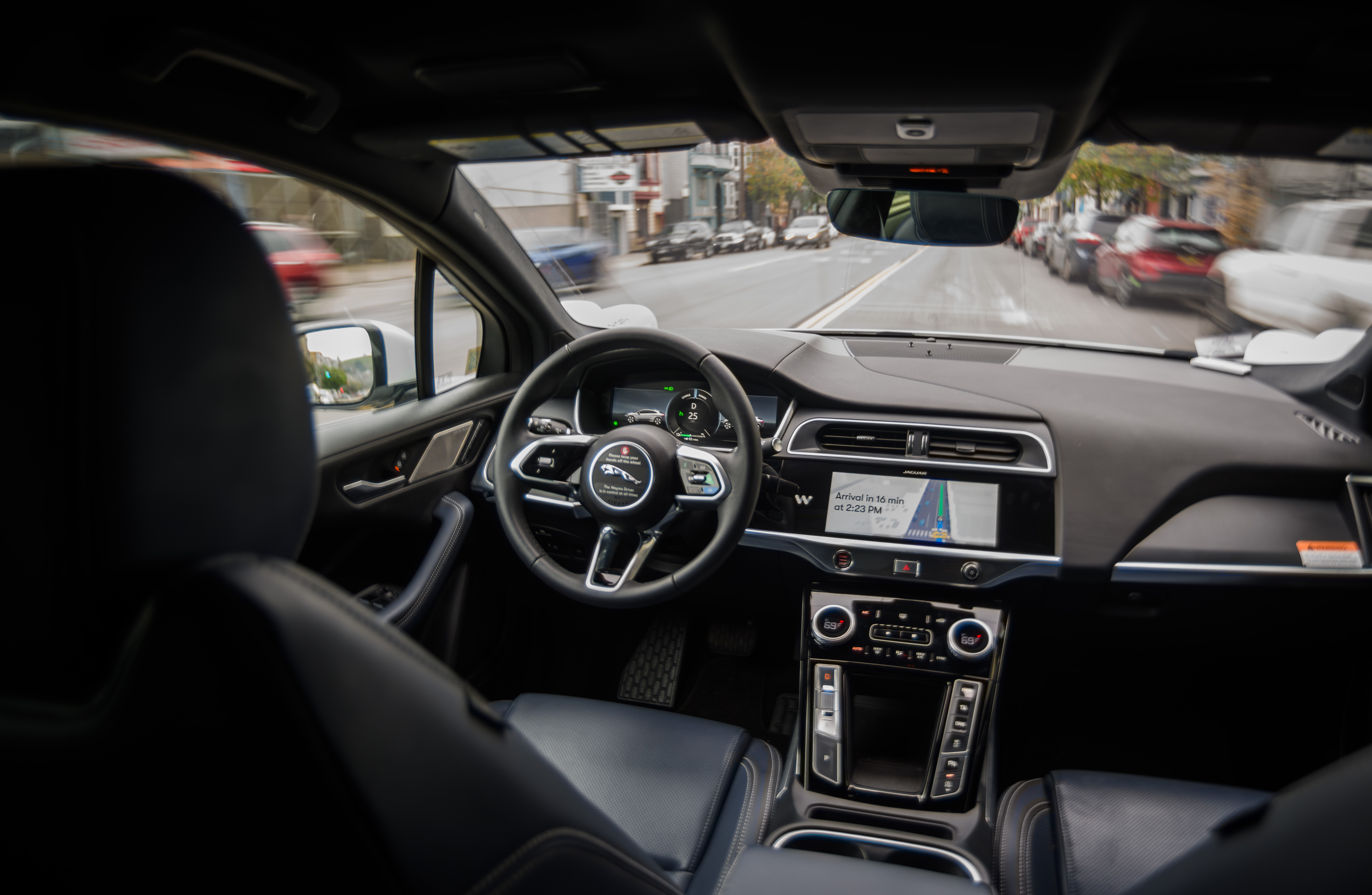
A Waymo Jaguar I-Pace as it autonomously drives through San Francisco, California

In early 2017, Waymo, the Google self-driving car project that became an independent company in 2016, started a large public robotaxi test in Phoenix, Arizona, using 100 and then 500 more Chrysler Pacifica Hybrid minivans provided by Fiat Chrysler Automobiles as part of a partnership between the two companies. Waymo also signed a deal with Lyft to collaborate on self-driving cars in May 2017. In November 2017, Waymo revealed it had begun to operate some of its automated vehicles in Arizona without a safety driver behind the wheel. In December 2018, Waymo started self-driving taxi service, dubbed Waymo One, in Arizona for paying customers. By November 2019, the service was operating autonomous vehicles without a safety backup driver.

After testing starting in 2021 and an application in late 2022, in August 2023 Waymo received a permit to offer unrestricted commercial driverless taxi service in San Francisco. Service was expanded into Silicon Valley during 2025.

As of December 2025, in addition to Phoenix and the San Francisco Bay Area, Waymo is operating in Los Angeles, California, Austin, Texas, and Atlanta, Georgia, and has announced expansion into 24 more metropolitan areas. In October 2025, Waymo announced it would start providing its services in London, its first international operating base, from 2026.

In February 2026, Waymo used an artificial intelligence model trained off of Genie 3 called the Waymo World Model to create edge-case scenarios for training their robotaxis.

As of June 2026, Waymo operates public commercial robotaxi services in 10 US metropolitan areas, has 3,871 robotaxis in service, provides 500,000 paid rides per week and had logged 200 million fully autonomous miles.

=== XPeng ===
In 2026 XPeng announced production of its first vision-only robotaxi that operates without Lidar or high-definition maps. It began testing Level 4 service in Guangzhou.

=== Other developments ===
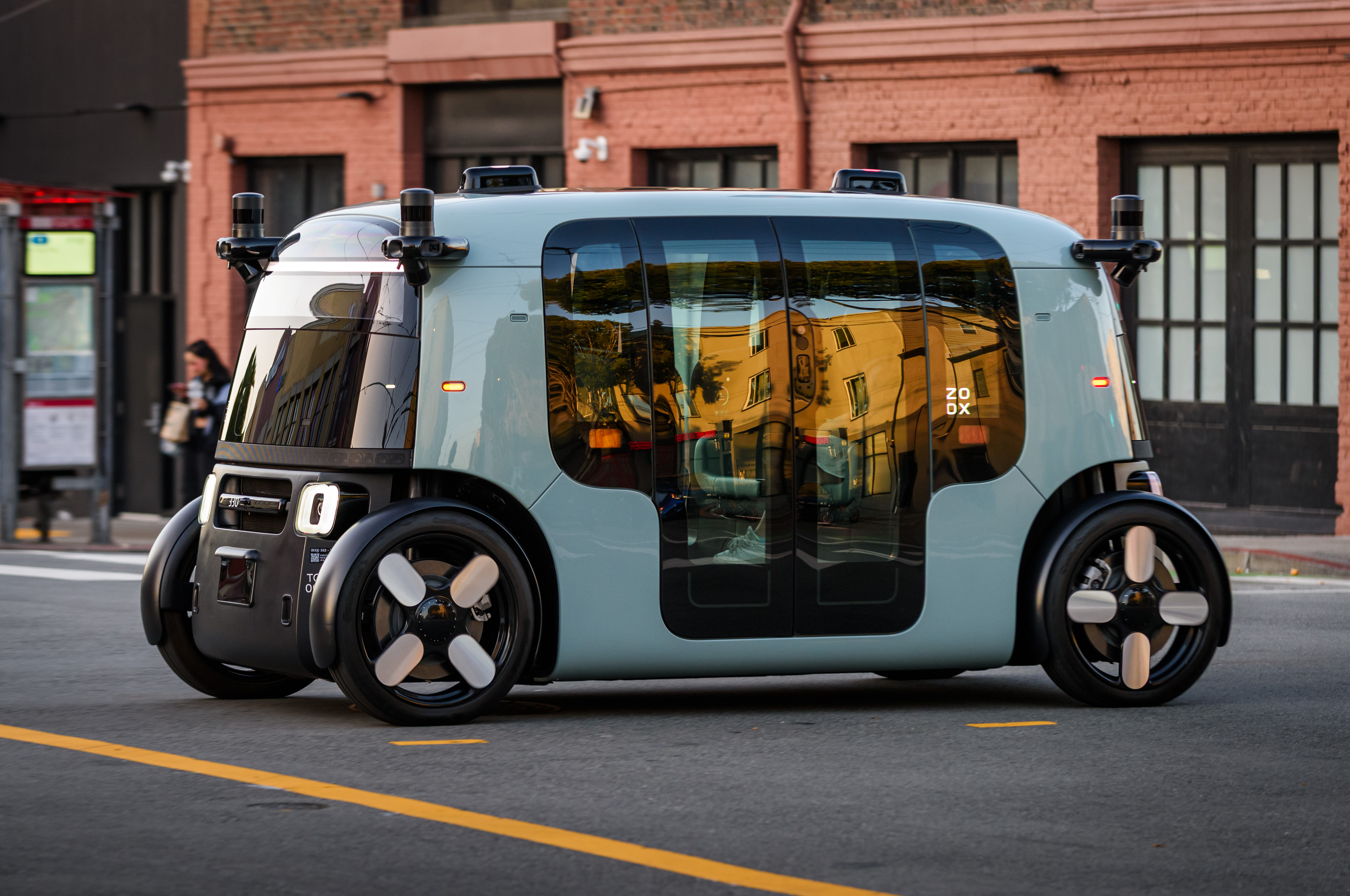
A purpose-built Zoox Robotaxi driving autonomously in San Francisco, California

Many automakers announced their plans in 2015–2018 to develop robotaxis before 2025 and specific partnerships have been signed between automakers, technology providers and service operators, including:

- The startup Zoox announcing in 2015 its ambition to build a robotaxi from scratch.
- BMW and Fiat Chrysler Automobiles partnering in 2016 with Intel and Mobileye to develop robotaxis by 2021.
- Baidu partnering in 2016 with Nvidia to develop autonomous cars and robotaxis.
- Daimler AG teaming up with Bosch in 2017 to develop the software for a robotaxi service by 2025.
- The Renault-Nissan-Mitsubishi Alliance partnering in 2017 with Transdev and DeNA to develop robotaxi services within 10 years.
- Honda releasing in 2017 an autonomous concept car, NeuV, that aims at being a personal robotaxi.
- Ford Motor's plan in 2017 to develop a robotaxi by 2021 through partnerships with several startups.
- Ford Motor investing $1 billion in the startup Argo AI in 2017 to develop autonomous cars and robotaxis; the startup was disbanded in 2022 by Ford.
- Lyft and Ford partnering in 2017 to add Ford's self-driving cars to Lyft's ride-hailing network; Google leading a $1 billion investment in 2017 in Lyft which could support Waymo's robotaxi strategy; in 2021, Lyft's self-driving division was sold to Toyota.
- Delphi buying the startup NuTonomy for $400 million in 2017.
- Parsons Corporation announcing in 2017 a partnership with automated mobility operating system company Renovo.auto to deploy and scale AMoD services.
- Didi Chuxing partnering in 2018 with the Renault-Nissan-Mitsubishi Alliance and other automakers to explore the future launch of robotaxi services in China.

== Profitability ==
Robotaxi services operate at a loss as of 2025, with operating costs per mile of about $7 to $9, compared to $1 a mile for personal cars. The consultancy McKinsey estimated that bringing costs down to less than $2 a mile would take until 2035.

== See also ==
- Apolong – Chinese driverless vehicle
- Self-driving car – Vehicle operated with reduced or no human input on public roads
