= Apollo Go =

Driverless taxi

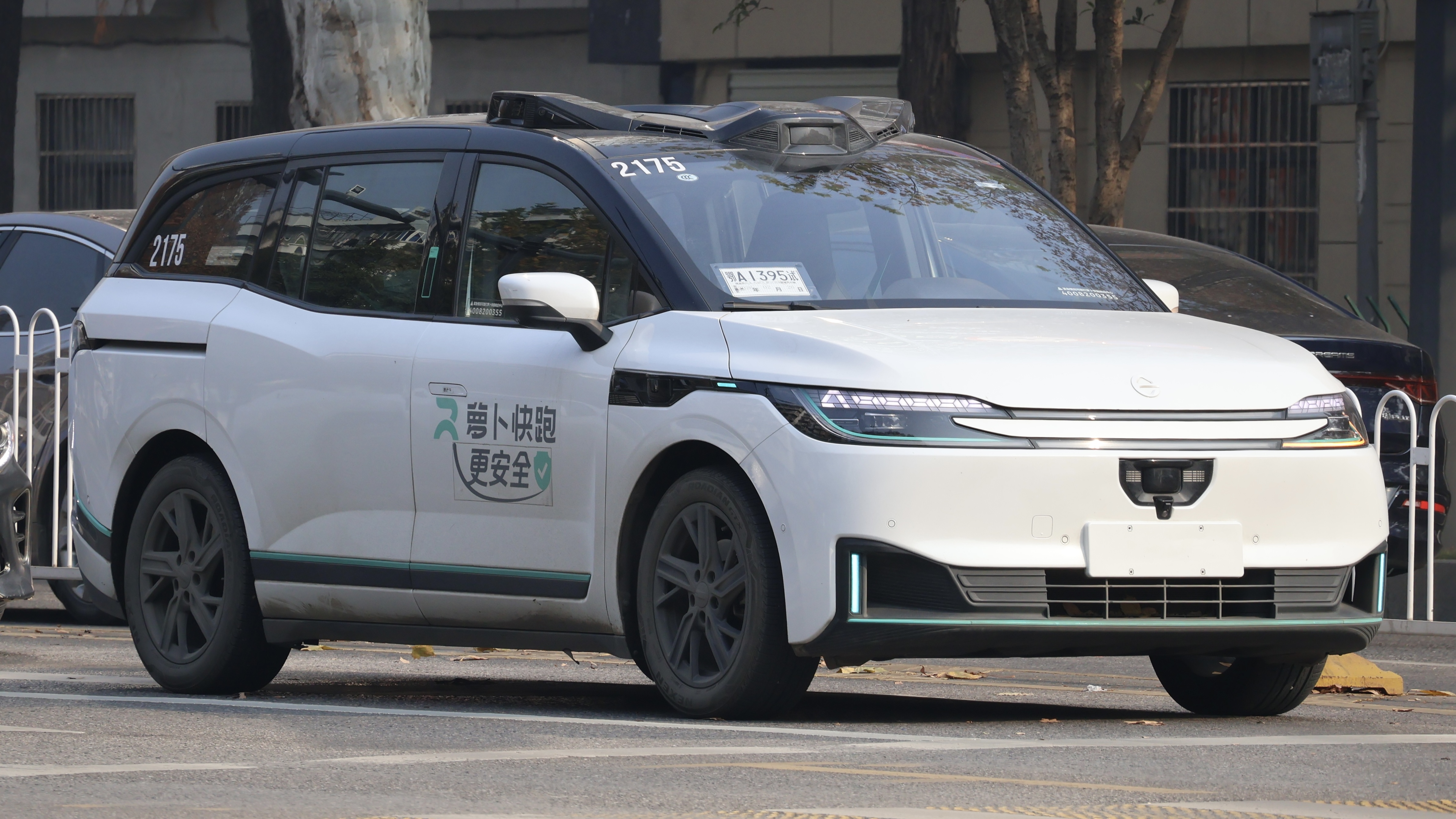
- An Apollo Go vehicle in Wuhan
- Industry: Robotaxis
- Website: www.apollogo.com

Apollo Go is an autonomous ride-hailing service provider (robotaxi) using the Baidu Apollo autonomous driving platform.

== History ==
On July 20, 2022, the first commercial pilot program for unmanned travel services in China was officially started in Beijing. The first batch of 25 BAIC Arcfox unmanned vehicles were officially approved to carry out regular paid travel services.

On July 21, 2022, Baidu and CCTV News jointly held the 2022 Baidu World Conference with the theme of "Deepening AI, Growing Everything". At the conference, Baidu released the sixth generation of mass-produced unmanned vehicle Apollo RT6. Apollo RT6 was expected to have the ability to drive autonomously on complex urban roads and cost only 250,000 yuan. According to the plan, Apollo RT6 was to be put into use in 2023.

On August 8, 2022, the governments of Chongqing and Wuhan took the lead in issuing a pilot policy for fully autonomous commercial vehicles and issued the first batch of national unmanned demonstration operation qualifications to Baidu, allowing autonomous vehicles without safety drivers to provide commercial services on public roads.

As of July 2024, the scope of the manned test service covered 11 cities, and was expected to carry out fully unmanned autonomous driving travel service tests in Beijing, Wuhan, Chongqing, Shenzhen, and Shanghai. It was expected to fully cover Wuhan by 2024, with plans to put 1,000 sixth-generation mass-produced unmanned vehicles into operation.

On November 29, 2024, the Hong Kong Transport Department stated that Apollo Go had obtained the first pilot license for autonomous vehicles, with the first phase of testing expected to begin before the end of 2024.

On 4 August 2025, Baidu had announced an agreement with Lyft to expand its car-sharing business into Europe. Under this agreement, Baidu will provide self-driving cars to Lyft. The cars will be manufactured by Jiangling Motors and are expected to operate in Germany and Britain starting in 2026.

== Services ==
Service areas
Country	City	Status	Launch date	Ref.
China	Beijing	Full commercial service	Sep 10, 2020	
China	Chongqing	Full commercial service	Aug 8, 2022	
China	Shenzhen	Full commercial service	June 17, 2023	
China	Wuhan	Full commercial service	Aug 8, 2022	
United Arab Emirates	Abu Dhabi	Service announced	—	
United Arab Emirates	Dubai	Full commercial service	Apr 1, 2026	

== Technology ==
Apollo RT6 is based on Baidu's self-developed "Apollo Galaxy" platform. As a purposely built vehicle with full driving system redundancy, its reliability is higher than that of the modified mass-produced cars. The hardware of Apollo RT6 includes redundancies in the architecture, computing unit, and braking system.

== See also ==
- Apolong, a self-driving minibus by the Apollo project
