= Gigafactory Texas =

Tesla, Inc. factory

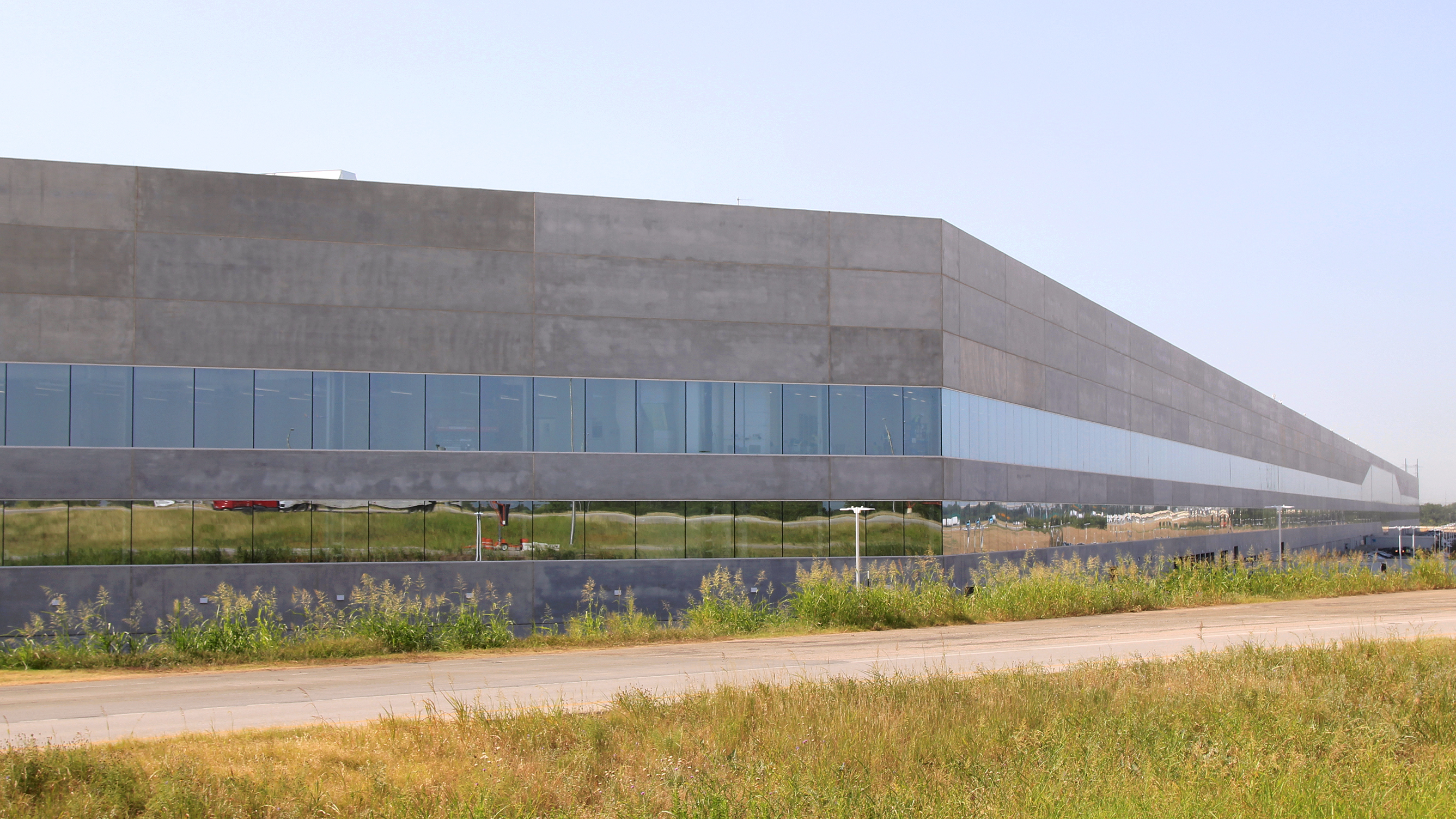
- Gigafactory Texas main building
- Built: 2020‒2022
- Operated: August 2021
- Location: 13101 Tesla Road; Austin, Texas, United States
- Coordinates: 30°13′15″N 97°37′07″W
- Industry: Automotive
- Products: Cybercab; Cybertruck; Model Y
- Employees: 16,506 (2025)
- Area: Floor area: 10,000,000 sq ft (930,000 m^{2}); Land: 2,100 acres (8.5 km^{2})
- Owner: Tesla, Inc.
- Website: tesla.com/giga-texas

Gigafactory Texas (also known as Giga Texas, Giga Austin, or Gigafactory 5) is a Tesla, Inc. automotive manufacturing facility in unincorporated Travis County, Texas, just outside of Austin. Construction began in July 2020, limited production of the Model Y began before the end of 2021, and initial deliveries of vehicles built at the factory took place at an opening party called "Cyber Rodeo" on April 7, 2022.

The factory produces Model Y cars for the Eastern United States and is also the main factory for the Cybertruck, the Cybercab, and the company's next-generation vehicle. It also serves as the site of Tesla's corporate headquarters. Elon Musk described it as the biggest factory in the United States.

Tesla originally planned to employ a staff of over 60,000 as production ramped up. However, in 2024, approx. 2,700 employees (12% of the factory's workforce) were terminated in one of the largest layoffs in Austin history. By the end of 2025, the number of employees at Gigafactory Texas had shrunk by 4,685 or 22% from the number of employees that had worked there at the end of 2024.

On November 6, 2026, Elon Musk announced plans to wind down Cybertruck production at Gigafactory Texas around mid-2027 to accommodate increased Cybercab production, following years of weak Cybertruck sales.

== History ==
=== Selection process ===
Tesla began considering locations across eight states in the central United States during 2019‒2020. Community groups and government officials in several areas of the US expressed interest in hosting what was expected to be a very large Tesla Gigafactory manufacturing facility. Some expressed interest in facilitating land procurement, getting over the regulatory obstacles, and considering potential tax incentives. Some aimed to reach Elon Musk directly through social media marketing.

By May 2020, a selection process was underway by Tesla. Nashville had been reported as a candidate, but the finalists were Austin and Tulsa (Oklahoma). Two locations in the vicinity of Tulsa had been viewed by Tesla by mid-May. The Tulsa campaign was promoted by G. T. Bynum, the mayor of Tulsa. In May 2020, Bynum discussed the suitability of "Green Country" (Northeastern Oklahoma) and distributed a photomontage of the Cybertruck in Tulsa Police Department livery, with a suggestion of local purchasing, if the Gigafactory was to be situated near Tulsa. On May 20, 2020, wrap advertising was applied to the Golden Driller statue located at the Tulsa Expo Center with the word "Tulsa" on statue's belt buckle replaced by the "Tesla" name. In July 2020, Tesla selected Austin as the site for the factory.

=== Austin ===
In 2014, Tesla evaluated a 1,500-acre (600 ha; 2 sq mi; 6 km^{2}) manufacturing site on U.S. Route 79 at Frame Switch (30.54°N 97.5°W), located between the towns of Hutto and Taylor, north-east of the Greater Austin center as its next factory. However, Tesla chose to build its first Gigafactory (now named Gigafactory Nevada) near Sparks, Nevada which is by Reno in 2014.

By June 2020, another location, one near the Del Valle area of Austin was being considered, a 2,100-acre (850 ha; 3.3 sq mi; 8.5 km^{2}) site bordering Harold Green Road (later renamed Tesla Road) and Texas State Highway 130. On June 16, 2020, the Commissioners' court of Travis County discussed a possible incentives package for Tesla. In July 2020, the Del Valle Independent School District approved a tax incentives package worth $68 million, should the Tesla Gigafactory be built. On July 22, 2020, during Tesla's second quarter 2020 earnings call, the company announced that location had been selected for its fifth Gigafactory.

By the end of July 2020, construction had begun. The Tesla Gigafactory received state tax incentives worth about $50 million through the Texas Tax Code Chapter 313 program. Tesla announced a manufacturing training program in cooperation with Austin Community College District on June 15, 2021. The program was expected to start in August 2021 and the course was to last 14 weeks. The first fully completed Tesla Model Y rolled off the line at Giga Texas in the last week of August 2021 under trial production. In December 2021, Elon Musk estimated that Giga Texas will require a total investment of at least $10B and may employ as many as 20,000 employees within the company.

In early 2022, Tesla battery suppliers CATL and Panasonic were reportedly scouting sites for battery factories in North America, including Kansas, Oklahoma, Mexico and Canada. Panasonic announced in July 2022 that the company selected De Soto, Kansas (at the former Sunflower Army Ammunition Plant) to build a battery factory. Large subsidies and abatements were granted to Panasonic, organized by Governor Laura Kelly.

=== Equipment ===
==== Die casting ====
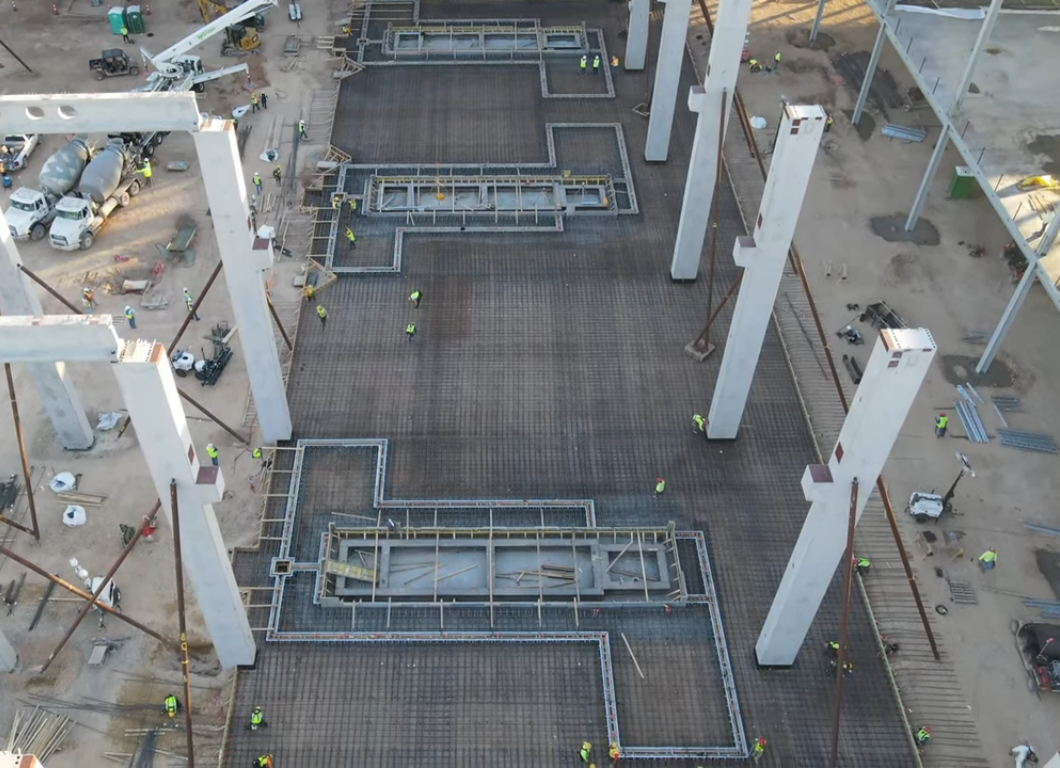
Construction workers preparing three Giga Press foundations at the Gigafactory Texas site in January 2021

During the night of January 18/19, 2021, concrete foundations for three Giga Press high-press die-casting machines were poured at the north-east corner Giga Texas factory location. On January 21, 2021, the first Giga Press components started to arrive on site in crates and shipping containers. On January 22, 2021, the base frame of the first Giga Press was unboxed and craned into position.

=== Ramp-up ===
Some time in late June 2022, Gigafactory Texas reached a run rate of 1,000 units a week. On December 15, 2022, Gigafactory Texas reached a run rate of 3,000 units a week.

== See also ==
- List of Tesla factories
