= Mazda Kabura =

Mazda Kabura Concept
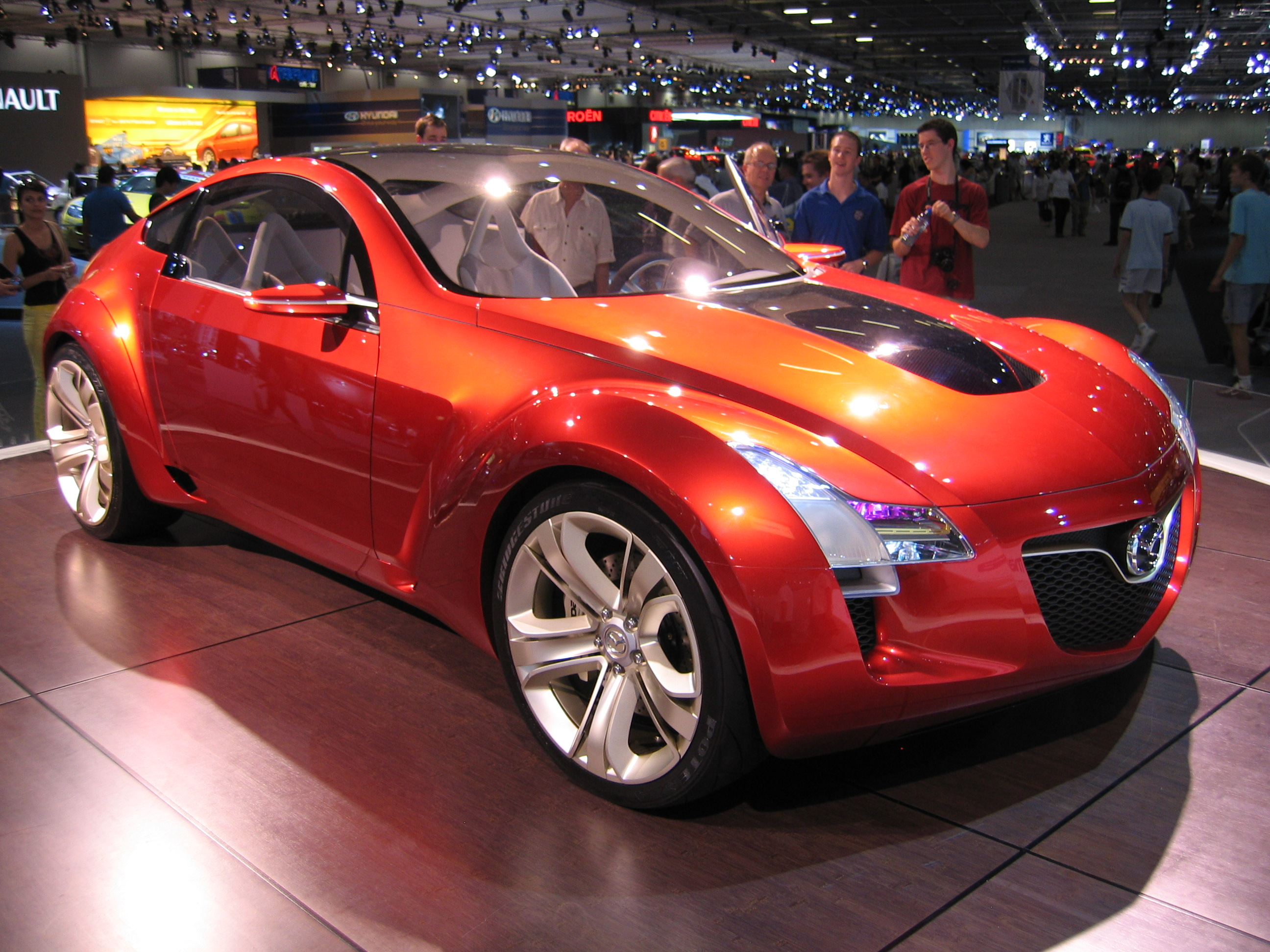

Overview
- Manufacturer: Mazda
- Designer: Franz von Holzhausen

Body and chassis
- Class: Sport compact
- Body style: 3-door coupé

Powertrain
- Engine: 2.0L Mazda MZR engine
- Transmission: Mazda 6MT 6-speed manual shift

Dimensions
- Wheelbase: 2.550 m (100.4 in.)
- Length: 4.050 m (159.4 in.)
- Width: 1.780 m (70.1 in.)
- Height: 1.280 m (50.4 in.)

The Mazda Kabura was a concept car shown by the Japanese manufacturer Mazda in 2006.

== Concept overview ==
The Kabura, introduced at the 2006 North American International Auto Show, was a sport compact which showed styling themes and technologies which could appear in future production models. It was designed in Irvine, California by Mazda of North America design chief Franz von Holzhausen, who designed the Pontiac Solstice.

Kabura incorporated the front-engine, rear-drive layout similar to the Mazda MX-5 and the Mazda RX-8 and hints of physical design characteristics similar to the Mazda RX-8 and the discontinued Mazda MX-3. Instead of a typical 2+2 layout, the Kabura had an unusual 3+1 arrangement, giving greater passenger space versus a traditional coupe, without increasing weight or size. All passenger seats folded flat to make additional room for cargo.

“Kabura” is a Japanese term taken from kabura-ya, an arrow that makes a howling sound when fired, and was historically used to signal the start of a battle. This “first arrow into battle” was meant to represent Mazda's pursuit of unique styling themes and technologies - such as the rotary engine. Kabura represented the first Mazda compact coupe for the 21st century. Mazda has never announced any plans to build a production version of the Kabura, but the design embodied several innovations that Mazda could have implemented when a compact sports coupe was ready for production. One of Kabura's roles was exposing a possible future design direction for a new model.

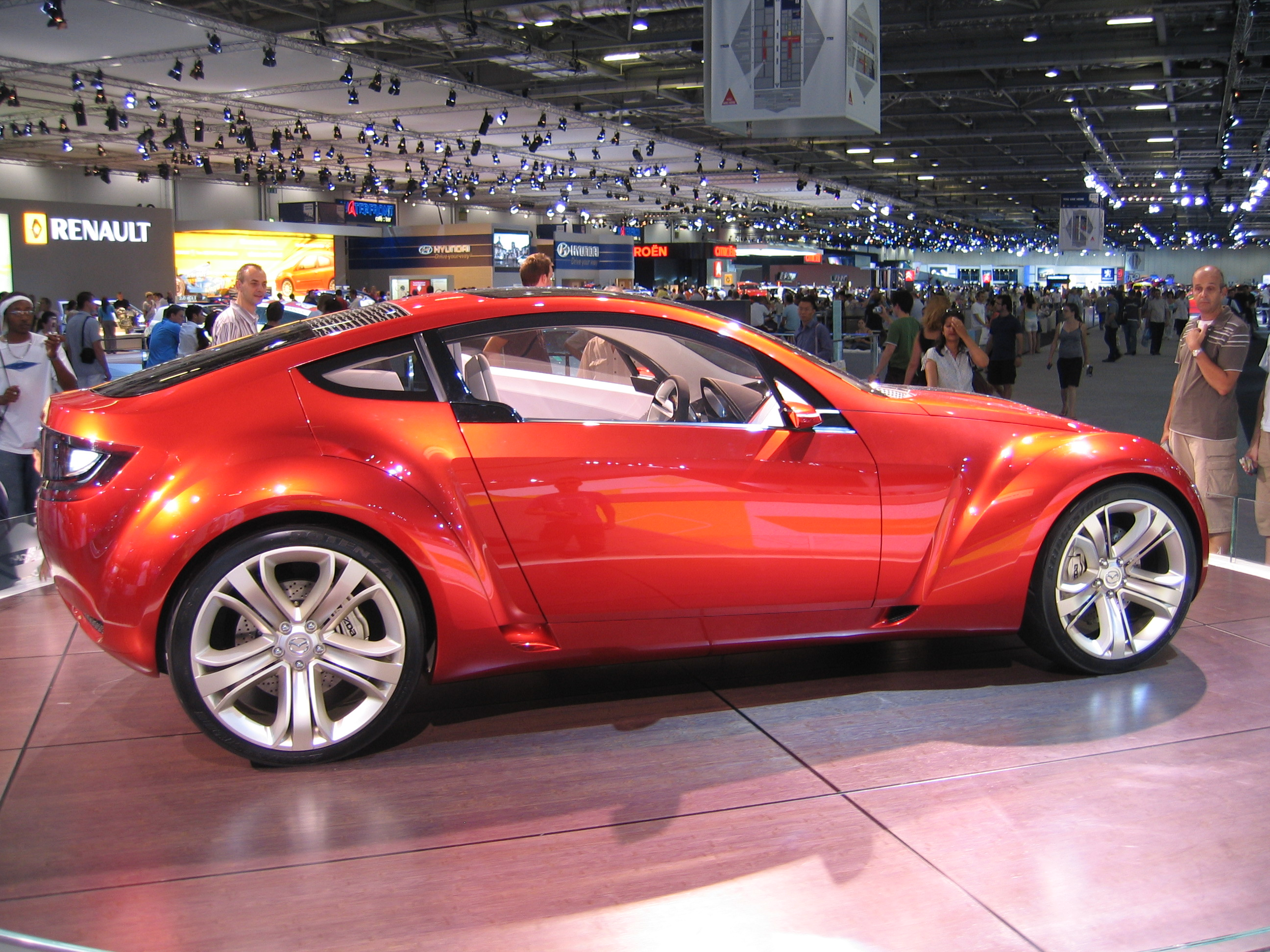
Rear 3/4 view

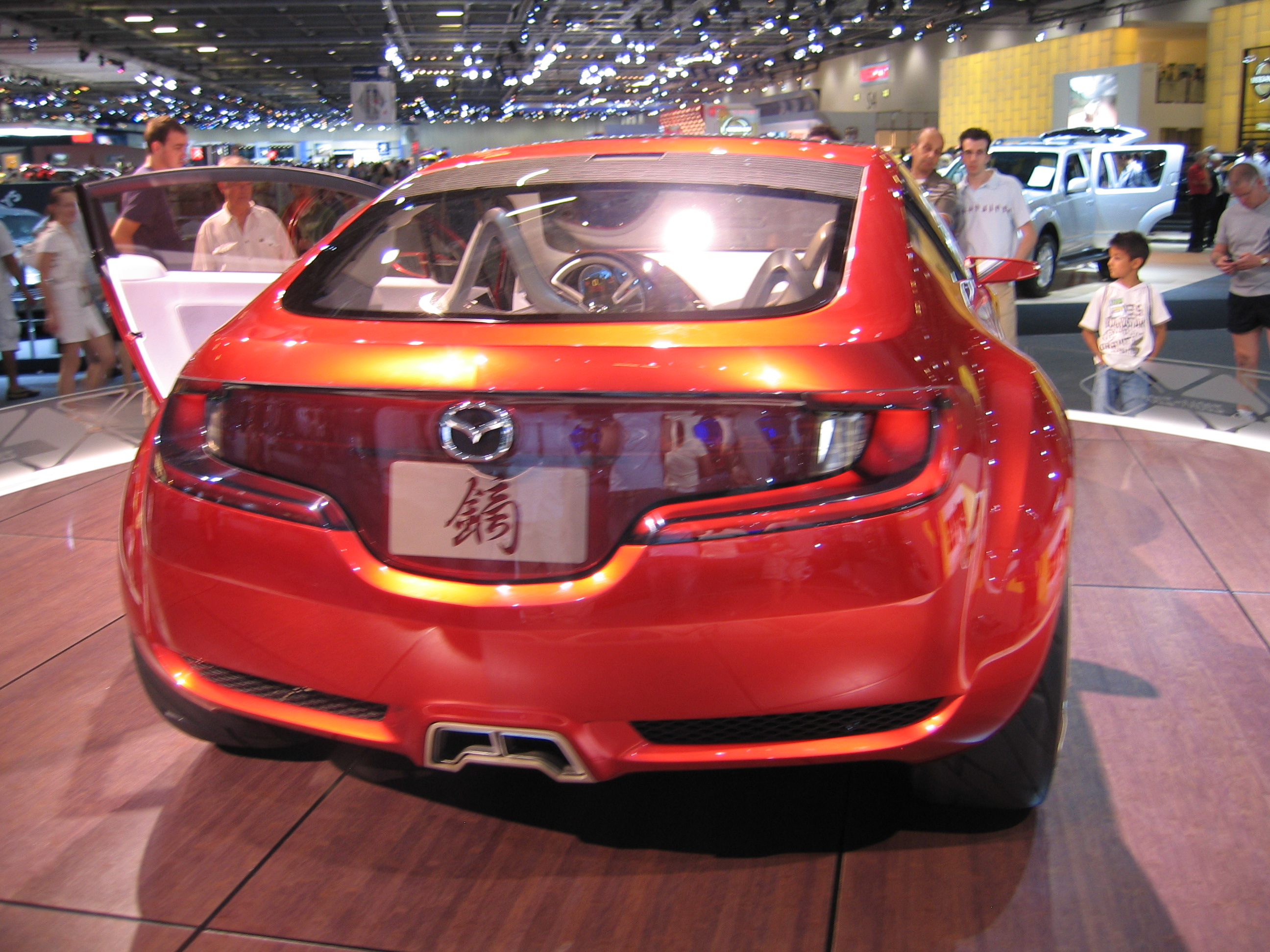
Rear view

Power was supplied to Kabura concept's rear wheels from a 2.0 L version of Mazda's MZR DOHC 16-valve engine. The Kabura used 245/35R19 Bridgestone Potenza front tires and 245/35R20 tires at the rear. While this concept has been assembled with several MX-5 chassis components, the basic dimensions fell between the MX-3 and the RX-8. As a sport compact, it would have slotted below the RX-8 in the Mazda lineup.

=== Exterior ===
The Kabura's exterior was described as a wide "powerful" stance, with pronounced wheel arches and taut surfaces, reminiscent of classic coupes. The windshield and forward portion of the roof were integrated into one seamless glass surface that extended from the cowl to the B-pillar. Overhead portions of the glass had adjustable tinting, so that the driver could adjust a knob to change the roof's opacity, as desired, from clear to completely opaque.

Behind the B-pillar was a two-piece glass hatch. The uppermost glass panel normally lied flush. When pivoted-up by an electric motor, it acted as a roof spoiler, which also vented air from the interior and increased rear passenger headroom. A photovoltaic solar cell in the panel could help the driver to control interior temperature, as well as it could also help recharge the battery for powering accessories. The larger glass hatch panel had side-mounted hinges to provide access to the Kabura's cargo compartment.

=== Interior ===
The unique 3+1 interior layout was designed to provide comfortable seating for one or two tandem passengers to the right of the driver, with only occasional use of the fourth "jump-seat" behind the driver as needed.

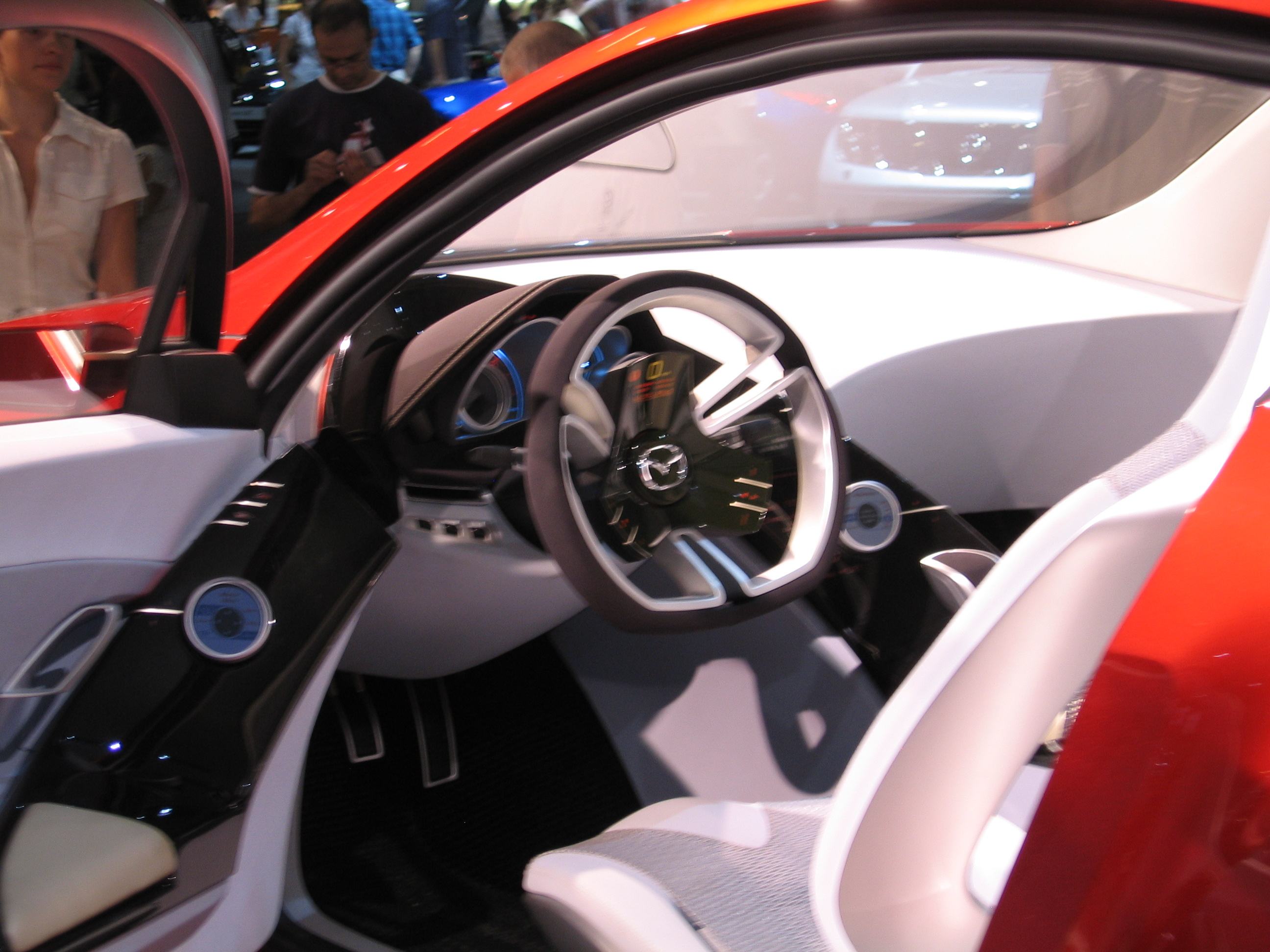
Interior

The driver's door provided access to the driver's cockpit, and to the rear jump seat. The other side of the car was a purposely asymmetrical arrangement. Eliminating the glovebox and minimizing the instrument panel allowed shifting the front passenger about six-inches ahead of the driver's seating position. In turn, the second inside passenger, sitting in tandem behind the inside passenger, had approximately the same leg, shoulder, and headroom as the front passenger. The Kabura included a secondary passenger-side door, allowing easier access to the seat behind the front passenger. After the front door was opened, touching a button slid the rear door straight back into a cavity notched into the rear-quarter panel area, instead of swinging on hinges.

Kabura's concept interior was produced from regenerated leather substrate, mostly from post-industrial waste recovered from the manufacturing of Nike brand athletic shoes.

=== Specifications ===
- Length: 4.05 m (159.4 in.)
- Width: 1.78 m (70.1 in.)
- Height: 1.28 m (50.4 in.)
- Wheelbase: 2.55 m (100.4 in.)
- Seating capacity: 4 person (3+1 seating)
- Engine: MZR 2.0 L DOHC 16-Valve
- Transmission: 6MT manual
- Suspension (F/R): Double Wishbone / Multi-Link
- Tires - Front: 245/35 R19
- Tires - Rear: 245/35 R20

== Production version ==
A production version of the Kabura was rumoured for the 2009 model year. Slotting in as an entry-level alternative to the RX-8 2+2, the Kabura was said to borrow significant mechanical components from the MX-5 roadster while having a similar shape to the MX-3. Although it never entered production, the 2011 RX-8 refresh drew inspiration from the Kabura.
