= Tax incentive =

Total or partial exemption from tax

A tax incentive is an aspect of a government's taxation policy designed to incentivize or encourage a particular economic activity by reducing tax payments.

According to a 2020 study of tax incentives in the United States, "states spent between 5 USD and 216 USD per capita on incentives for firms." There is some evidence that this leads to direct employment gains but there is not strong evidence that the incentives increase economic growth. Tax incentives that target individual companies are generally seen as inefficient, economically costly, and distortionary, as well as having regressive economic effects. Tax incentives can cause negative effects on a government's financial condition, among other negative effects, if they are not properly designed and implemented.

== Corporate tax incentives ==
Corporate tax incentives can be raised at federal, state, and local government levels. For example, in the United States, the federal tax code provides a wide range of incentives for corporations, totaling $109 billion in 2011, according to a Tax Foundation Study.

The Tax Foundation categorizes US federal tax incentives into four main categories, listed below:

- Tax exclusions for local bonds valued at $12.4 billion.
- Preferences aimed at advancing social policy, valued at $9 billion.
- Preferences that directly benefit specific industries, valued at $17.4 billion.
- Preferences broadly available to most corporate taxpayers, valued at $68.7 billion.

Corporate tax incentives provided by state and local governments are also included in the US tax code but are very often directed at individual companies involved in a corporate site selection project. Site selection consultants negotiate these incentives, which are typically specific to the corporate project the state is recruiting, rather than applicable to a broader industry. Examples include the following:

- Corporate income tax credit
- Property tax abatement
- Sales tax exemption
- Payroll tax refund

In Armenia, corporate income tax incentive is available for Armenian resident entities that meet several criteria under the government's export promotion-oriented program. Those entities that are part of the government approved program receive reduced corporate income tax rates up to tenfold from the 20% rate. Taxpayers running their operations in free economics zones (FEZ) are free from corporate income tax in respect of income received from activities implemented in free economic zones in Armenia.

=== List of largest US tax incentive deals ===
- Washington: Boeing, $8.7 billion until 2040, partly for the 777X
- New York: Alcoa, $5.6 billion
- Washington: Boeing, $3.2 billion
- Oregon: Nike, $2 billion
- New Mexico: Intel, $2 billion
- Louisiana: Cheniere Energy, $1.7 billion
- Pennsylvania: Royal Dutch Shell, $1.65 billion over 25 years for the Pennsylvania Shell ethylene cracker plant
- Missouri: Cerner Corp., $1.64 billion
- Michigan: Chrysler, $1.3 billion
- Nevada: Tesla Gigafactory 1, $1.25 billion over 20 years
- Mississippi: Nissan Canton, $1.25 billion

=== Historical preservation tax incentive ===
Not all tax incentives are structured for individuals or corporations, as some tax incentives are meant to help the welfare of the society. For example, the historical preservation tax incentive. The US federal government pushes, in many situations, to preserve historical buildings. One way the government does so is through tax incentives for the rehabilitation of historic buildings. The tax incentives to preserve the historic buildings can generate jobs, increase private investment in the city, create housing for low-income individuals in the historic buildings, and enhance property values. Currently, according to the Tax Reform Act of 1986, there are two major incentives in this category. The first incentive is a tax credit of 20% for rehabilitation of historic structures. A historic structure is defined as a building listed in the National Register of Historic Places or a building in a registered historic district, acknowledged by the National Park Service. The second incentive is a tax credit of 10% for rehabilitation of structures built before 1936 but are considered non-residential and non-historical.

== Individual incentives ==
Individual tax incentives are a prominent form of incentive and include deductions, exemptions, and credits. Specific examples include the mortgage interest deduction, individual retirement account, and hybrid tax credit.

Another form of an individual tax incentive is the income tax incentive. Though mostly used in transitioning and developing countries, usually correlating with insufficient domestic capita, the income tax incentive is meant to help the economic welfare of direct investors and corresponds with investing in production activities and finally, many times is meant to attract foreign investors.

These incentives are introduced for various reasons. Firstly, they are seen to counterbalance investment disincentives stemming from the normal tax system. Others use the incentives to equalize disadvantages to investing such as complicated laws and insufficient infrastructure.

== Impact ==
According to a 2020 study, tax competition "primarily reduces taxes for mobile firms and is unlikely to substantially affect the efficiency of business location." A 2020 NBER paper found some evidence that state and local business tax incentives in the United States led to employment gains but no evidence that the incentives increased broader economic growth at the state and local level.

A 2021 study found that multinational firms boosted wages and employment in localities, but that the surplus that the firms generated tended to go back to them in the form of local subsidies.

== See also ==
- Taxation in the United States
- Tax exemption
- Tax competition
- Texas Tax Code Chapter 313
