= Von Holzhausen =

Textile material innovation company based in California, US

von Holzhausen
- Type: Private
- Industry: Biotechnology, Material Science
- Founder: Vicki von Holzhausen
- Headquarters: Los Angeles, CA
- Products: Liquidplant, Banbū, Technik
- Website: vonholzhausen.com

von Holzhausen is an innovation company based in Los Angeles, California. The company uses plants, recycled fibers, and biodegradable materials to create sustainable materials at scale.

== History ==
von Holzhausen was founded in Malibu in 2015 by former automotive designer Vicki von Holzhausen, spouse of Tesla chief designer Franz von Holzhausen.

The company began by developing materials for handbags and other accessories. Today it supplies sustainanable materials to a variety of industries including fashion, furniture, aerospace, footwear, and automotive.

== Products ==
The company's technologies range from plant-based leathers to plastic alternatives. Notable developments include Liquidplant, a 100 percent plant-based plastic that replaces petroleum versions, and a biodegradation technology that allows materials to break down in a landfill condition.

The company has three commercially available products including Technik, Banbū, and Liquidplant.

== Collaborations ==
The company has partnered with corporations such as Apple and Dell to create product ranges sold worldwide. They have also worked with automakers such as Cupra, Koenigsegg, and Lexus to create custom car interiors made with their material Banbū.

In 2024, the company's material became available on The Eames Lounge Chair and Ottoman by Herman Miller. In 2025, designer Patricia Urquiola used the company's materials in a custom installation for Elle Decor's 35th anniversary at Salone del Mobile Milano.

In 2026, Vanderbilt worked with von Holzhausen to develop a plant-based solution for the John Seigenthaler Center.

== Awards ==
von Holzhausen has been recognized for their innovations in the SEAL Business Sustainability Awards, Fast Company’s World Changing Ideas and Innovation by Design Awards, INC's Female Founder Awards, Wall Paper's Smart Space Awards, Red Dot's Design Concept Awards, the Deezen Awards, SXSW Innovation Awards ITMF Sustainability & Innovation Awards, the Core77's Design Awards, and TIME's Best Innovations of 2026.
