= Tesla Cybercab =

Fully-autonomous electric car

- Cybercab driving near Palo Alto

Overview
- Manufacturer: Tesla, Inc.
- Production: April 2026 – present (pilot production from February 2026)
- Assembly: United States: Austin, Texas (Gigafactory Texas)
- Designer: Franz von Holzhausen

Body and chassis
- Class: Driverless vehicle
- Body style: 2-door liftback coupe
- Layout: Front-motor, front-wheel-drive
- Doors: Butterfly
- Related: Tesla Model 3 Tesla Model Y

Powertrain
- Electric motor: 1× AC permanent magnet synchronous
- Power output: 219 hp (222 PS; 163 kW)
- Battery: 47.6 kWh lithium-ion
- Electric range: ~293 mi (472 km)

Dimensions
- Curb weight: 3,113 lb (1,412 kg)

The Tesla Cybercab is a two-passenger battery-electric robotaxi manufactured by Tesla, Inc. for its Robotaxi ride-hailing service. Designed exclusively for autonomous operation, it has no steering wheel, pedals, side mirrors, or rear window and uses a camera-only autonomous-driving system rather than the lidar and radar used by some competing robotaxis.

Tesla unveiled the Cybercab in October 2024, began production in February 2026, and started offering paid public rides in Austin, Texas, in September 2026. The vehicle is intended to become the principal vehicle in Tesla's Robotaxi fleet and is central to the company's plans for autonomous ride-hailing. Tesla has targeted an operating cost of less than US$0.30 per mile for the Cybercab.

In September 2026, the National Highway Traffic Safety Administration (NHTSA) opened an audit of the basis for Tesla's self-certification of the Cybercab to federal safety standards.

== History ==
=== Background ===
In 2019, Tesla CEO Elon Musk stated that he believed that Tesla would have one million autonomous robotaxis operating on public roads by the end of 2020; observers speculated that he meant converting already sold Tesla vehicles to be autonomous.

Since approximately 2020, Tesla had made public statements about a mass market electric car product that would follow the Model Y and would be considerably cheaper than the Model 3. In 2022, Musk was advocating inside the company that the Robotaxi would be Tesla's next vehicle, but by September 2022, he had reluctantly accepted the recommendation of Tesla executives Franz von Holzhausen and Lars Moravy that the next-generation vehicle platform should support both a small, inexpensive, mass-market car and a Robotaxi that would be built with no steering wheel at all, and that both could be manufactured on the platform and use the same next-generation vehicle assembly line. In October 2022, the company stated publicly that the Tesla engineering team had turned its focus to the new platform, and that the company expected the platform would enable cars to be half of the price of the Tesla Model 3 or Y.

In April 2024, Musk announced that the Robotaxi reveal would take place in August, which was subsequently delayed to October due to design change of the Robotaxi.

=== Announcement ===
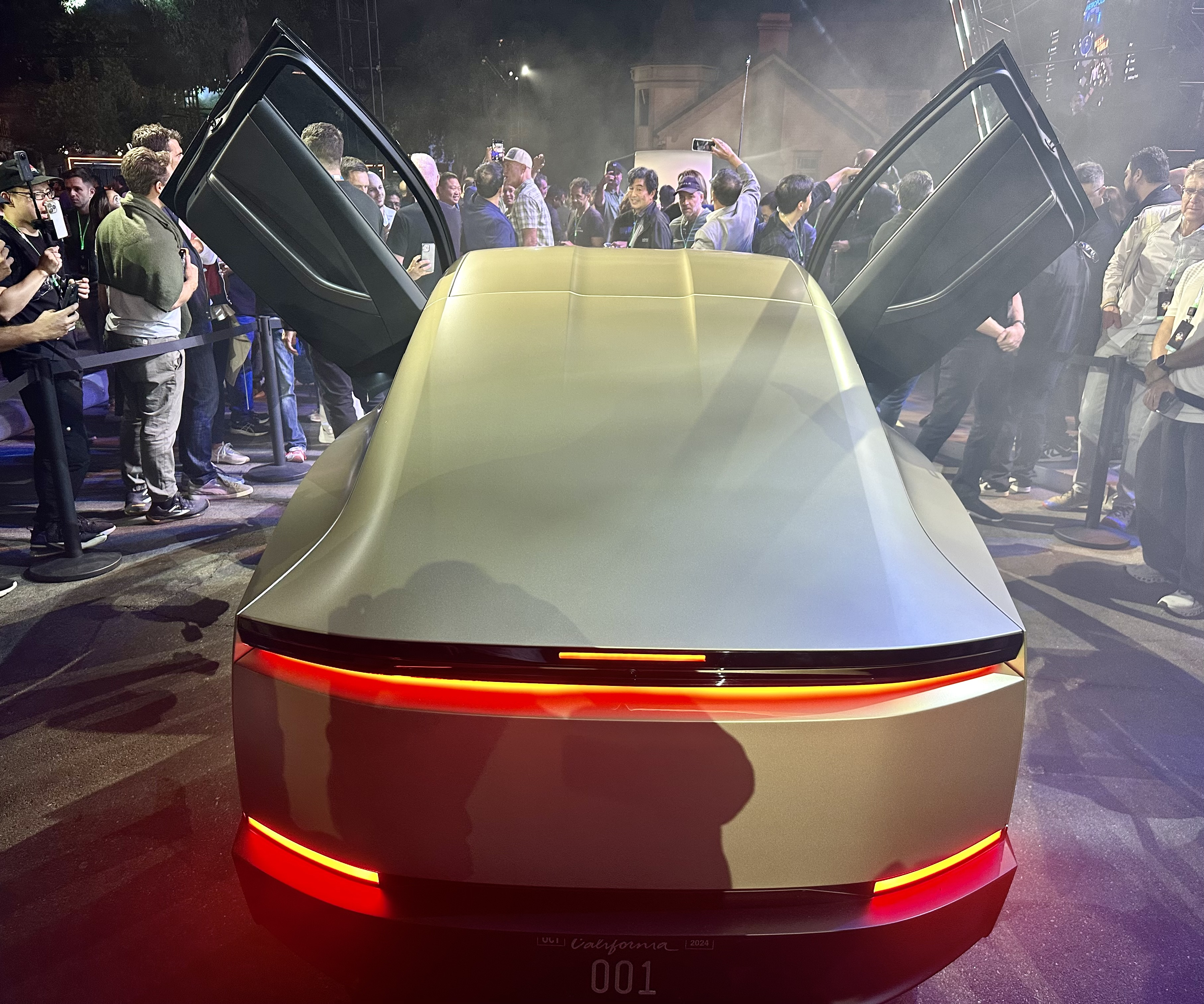
Rear view of the Tesla Cybercab at its unveiling

Musk unveiled the Cybercab at the Tesla We, Robot event held October 10, 2024, at Warner Bros. Studios Burbank in California, where 20 concept Cybercabs autonomously drove around the studio outlot at night and gave rides to event attendees. Musk stated that Tesla intended to produce the Cybercab before 2027. Tesla used both "Robotaxi" and "Cybercab" throughout the event to refer to the cars. Tesla also demonstrated its humanoid robot, Optimus, at the event and showed off a single concept prototype of a Robovan that could reportedly hold as many as 20 passengers.

The concept Cybercab shown was a two-passenger car. It had two butterfly doors but no door handles as the doors opened automatically, and no rear window or side view mirrors. The car had a hatchback opening for cargo, with no external charge port showing.

Investor reaction to the announcement was muted, particularly given the long time frame between the announcement and expected start of production.

=== Production ===
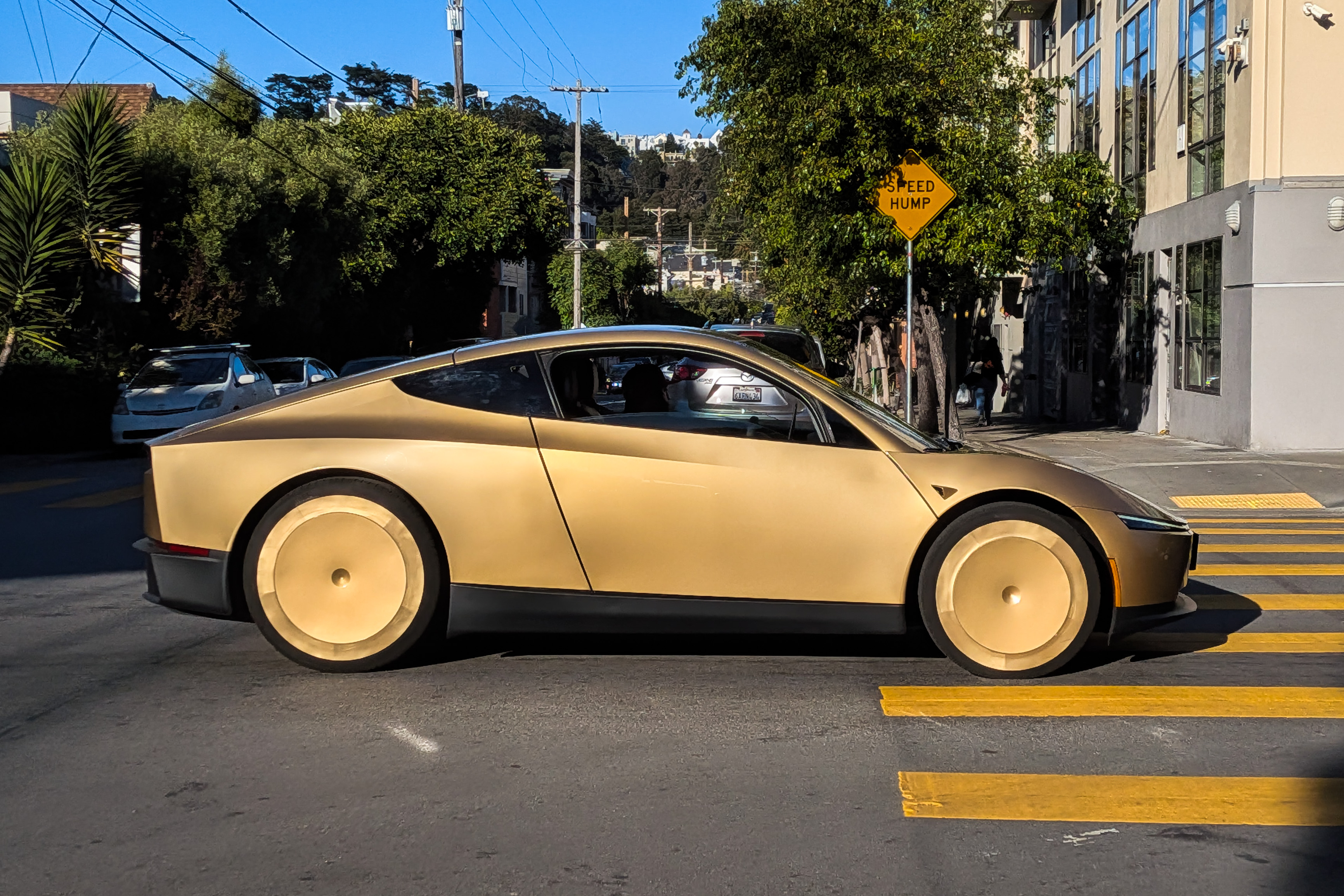
A Cybercab drives on a public street in San Francisco in June 2026.

On Tesla's earnings call on October 23, 2024, Elon Musk said the Cybercab would reach volume production in 2026 and that Tesla was aiming for at least 2 million Cybercabs a year across more than one factory.

In November 2025 at the Shareholder meeting, Elon Musk announced that the Cybercab production would begin in the second quarter of 2026.

In February 2026, Tesla announced the first Cybercab production vehicle had been produced at the Gigafactory Texas near Austin. By mid-March, Cybercab test units were spotted on public roads in Austin, Texas, and in Silicon Valley, as well at Gigafactory Texas, many of them operating in test cycles on area roads. Formal production began in April 2026. By July 2026, hundreds of Cybercab vehicles had been spotted near Gigafactory Texas.

=== Commercial introduction ===
On September 3, 2026, Tesla held an invitation-only Cybercab launch event in Austin, Texas at ACL Live. Tesla executives presented for about 15 minutes; Elon Musk was not present. An expected live stream of the event did not occur.

The next day, Tesla started offering paid Cybercab rides in Austin through its existing Robotaxi service. The service has operated since June 2025 using autonomous Model Y vehicles.

On September 9, 2026, Tesla started an Asia Cybercab road show in Hong Kong, and plans to show it simultaneously in Japan (Tokyo, Osaka and Nagoya) and China (Beijing and Shanghai). The road show does not involve sales, test drives or commercial robotaxi operations.

Tesla has taken steps to investigate the possibility of selling the Cybercab to third-party fleet operators. Autoevolution reported in September 2026 that the Cybercab was not designed for individual buyers, despite Musk's 2024 statements to the contrary.

As of October 10, 2026, Tesla has registered 319 Cybercabs in Texas.

=== Regulatory investigations ===
Tesla self-certified the Cybercab, which lacks a steering wheel, pedals and mirrors, as compliant with all applicable Federal Motor Vehicle Safety Standards (FMVSS). On September 3, 2026, the day commercial service began, NHTSA opened an audit query to examine the process and technical data behind that certification, including the extent to which it relied on treating certain standards as inapplicable. On September 10, NHTSA issued a special order requiring sworn answers to questions about the certification. Separately, NHTSA had proposed in June 2026 to amend FMVSS No. 135 so that vehicles designed never to be driven by a human would not need manual brake controls.

The Austin Fire Department said the absence of conventional controls could make it harder for firefighters to move a stalled Cybercab blocking a street; firefighters were trained to move the vehicle using its touchscreen.

== Design ==
Interior front of the concept Cybercab

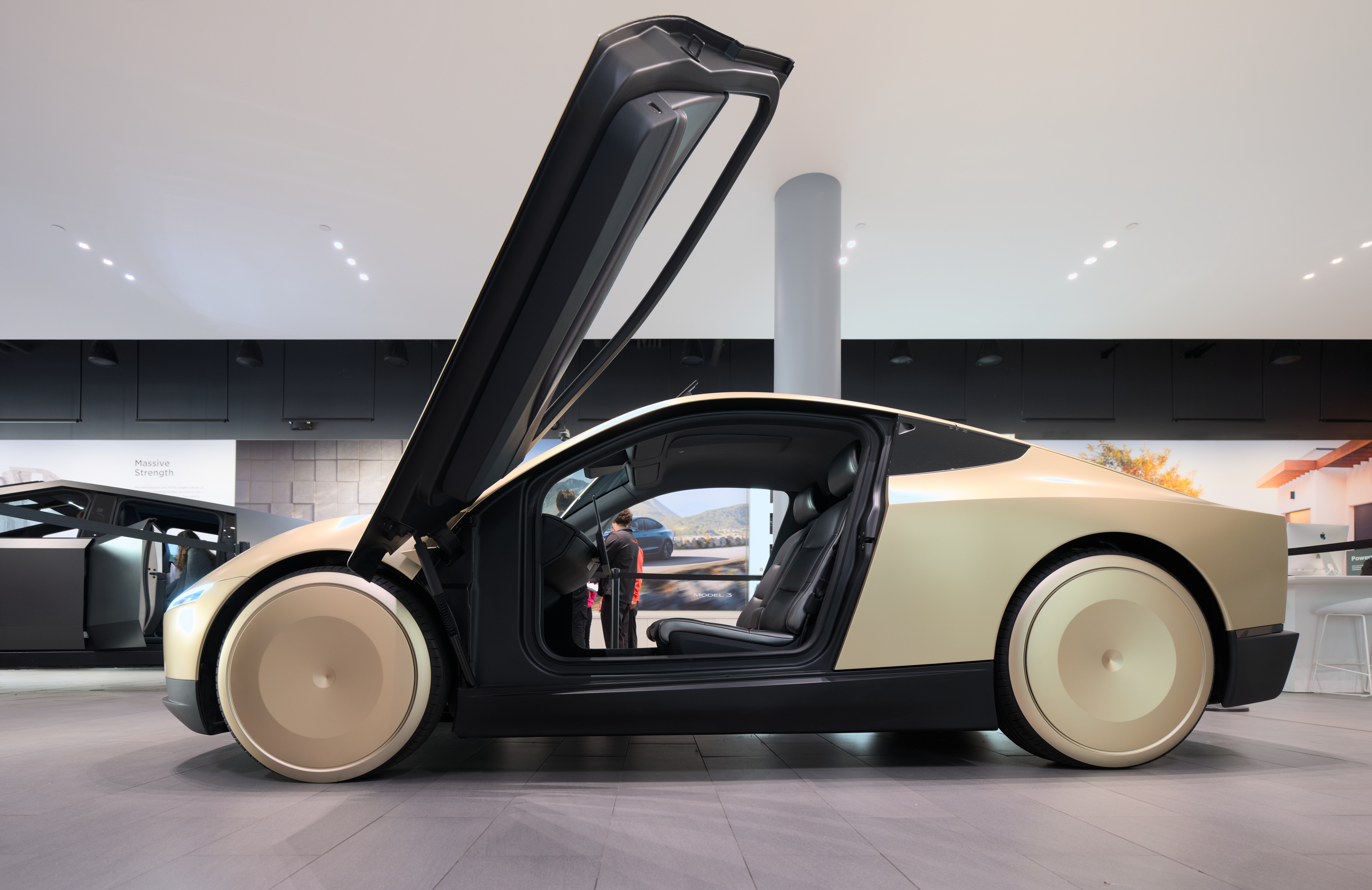
Side view of the concept Cybercab

Cybercab is designed for autonomous operation and only uses cameras, unlike autonomous competitors such as Waymo and Zoox which use lidar, radar, and other sensors. It does not have a steering wheel, pedals, side mirrors, or a back window. The butterfly doors have no door handles because they open and close automatically.

Tesla chose it to be a two-passenger car because it says over 90% of vehicle miles traveled are with two or fewer passengers. For rides with more than two passengers, the Model Y robotaxi is available now, and Tesla says other Tesla vehicles will be available in the future.

Tesla stated the Cybercab design priorities were low-cost production, ease of manufacturing and maximum efficiency. Tesla has said it has about half of the parts of a Tesla Model 3. It is Tesla's first vehicle produced using the "unboxed process", which Tesla says makes the production line half as long, unlocking much greater factory capacity, and significantly cutting costs. Musk says the process was "redesigned ... to make its production speed more than 5 times faster than traditional automotive manufacturing!" The exterior body panels use reaction injection molding instead of paint to provide the gold color, which Tesla says reduces time and cost. The gold color was chosen to represent the "golden era of transport". Plastic parts are welded ultrasonically. The Cybercab is the narrowest of all of Tesla vehicles (including the original Roadster), and the first with only front wheel drive, both of which save on cost and reduce complexity.

Tesla says the Cybercab has a drag coefficient under 0.20, making it one of the most aerodynamically efficient vehicles ever produced. Tesla said its motor is "18 percent smaller, 25 percent lighter, and more efficient than other top-performing electric vehicle drive units." At 165 watt-hours per mile (103 Wh/km), it is the most efficient electric vehicle by a wide margin. Tesla says the designed life of the vehicle is 500,000 miles (800,000 km). It uses an electric brake-by-wire system.

The range is ~293 miles (472 km). Battery capacity is 48 kWh and uses 4680 cells in an 88S6P configuration.

In August 2026, the vehicle's roof was displayed with a flush-mounted integrated Starlink version 5 antenna. Musk said Starlink capabilities would be offered on the vehicle, such as passengers watching 4K live video, as well as vehicle operations such over-the-air updates, navigation data, remote diagnostics, dispatch coordination, and fleet management. The Starlink connection is not required for autonomous driving.

=== Accessibility ===
The Cybercab was designed for accessibility. Tesla has stated its goal is "an autonomous future that is accessible to all people." With its braille on the physical buttons, and voice control of other capabilities, it is designed to be operated by a blind person. It allows an easier approach by a wheelchair due to its butterfly doors and an easier transfer because its bench seats are at the same height as standard wheelchairs.

== Specifications ==
Cybercab specifications
| Specification | Model (driverless) |
|---|---|
| Drive | single motor, front wheel drive, with regenerative braking |
| Motor | AC three-phase permanent magnet; 219 hp (163 kW) |
| Drivetrain | fixed ratio single speed 11:1 |
| Battery energy storage | 48 kWh (170 MJ) Lithium nickel manganese cobalt oxides Lithium-ion, 88s6p from form factor 4680 cells in 4 modules |
| Battery Ah capacity | 146 Ah |
| Battery voltage (nominal) | 326 V |
| Battery specific energy | 145 Wh/kg |
| Range (EPA preliminary) | ~293 mi (472 km) |
| Curb weight | 3,113 lb (1,412 kg) |
| Payload capacity | 617 lb (280 kg) |
| Gross vehicle weight rating | 3,730 lb (1,690 kg) |
| Efficiency | 165 watt-hours per mile (103 Wh/km) |
| Drag coefficient | under 0.20 |
| 0 to 60 mph | |
| Top speed | |
| Seats | 2 |

== Full self-driving (unsupervised) ==
As of September 2026, Cybercabs are using Full-Self Driving (FSD) version 15 (unsupervised). Musk described V15 as "a complete overhaul of the software architecture", with ten times the parameters of its predecessor, and including seven "core technologies" with 40% of them already running in the robotaxi fleet. The Cybercabs are running this software on a modified version of Hardware 4, which is also not available to consumer cars.

== Charging ==
The production Cybercab uses a concealed North American Charging Standard (NACS) port for direct-current (DC) fast charging at Tesla Superchargers and other public DC chargers. The vehicles do not currently support alternating-current (AC) charging and therefore could not use a Tesla Wall Connector, Mobile Connector, or other residential Level 2 equipment. At the October 2024 unveiling, Tesla said the Cybercab would recharge by inductive wireless charging and would not need a plug; Tesla has described wireless charging as a planned fleet feature and has filed plans for robotaxi hubs that include wireless pads. Tesla has said its inductive system is expected to be more than 90 percent efficient.

== Manufacturing cost and operational efficiency ==
The International Energy Agency (IEA) reported in 2026 that Waymo's Jaguar I-Pace robotaxis initially cost more than $100,000 per vehicle and that newer Waymo vehicles had reduced the cost to around $70,000. The IEA said that Tesla was targeting much lower robotaxi costs by relying solely on cameras; TechCrunch also attributed Waymo's higher vehicle costs to its use of multiple types of sensors and vehicles manufactured by other companies, while Tesla uses a camera-based autonomous-driving system and manufactures its own vehicles.

Tesla has targeted an operating cost of less than $0.30 per mile for the Cybercab. In December 2025, The Information reported that Morgan Stanley analysts estimated Tesla's robotaxi operating cost at $0.81 per mile, compared with approximately $1.43 per mile for Waymo. The analysts projected that newer Waymo vehicles planned for deployment in 2026 would reduce Waymo's operating cost to $0.99–$1.08 per mile.
