= Tesla Robovan =

Self-driving van from Tesla

Overview
- Manufacturer: Tesla, Inc.
- Designer: Franz von Holzhausen

Body and chassis
- Body style: Van

The Tesla Robovan is an electric autonomous van. Announced in October 2024 during the We Robot event, the vehicle is being designed to carry up to 20 passengers.

== History ==
=== Background ===
The Tesla Master Plan Part Deux, released in 2016, said Tesla was developing "high passenger-density urban transport" and suggested autonomous buses could be shrunk in size, and in July 2022 Tesla CEO Elon Musk tweeted "Maybe Tesla should make a highly configurable Robovan for people & cargo?"

TechCrunch reported that a larger vehicle teased at Tesla's 2023 Investor Day in March 2023 was likely the Robovan. The Tesla Master Plan Part 3, released in April 2023, listed "Commercial/Passenger Vans" and "Bus" in its global fleet model, with the Tesla equivalent for each still "TBD".

=== Announcement ===
A concept version of the autonomous electric Robovan was unveiled on 10 October 2024 at the "We, Robot" event at Warner Brothers Studio in Los Angeles, with a prototype driving up near the main stage, and 14 people exited the vehicle. The Cybercab and the first free-walking Optimus humanoid robots were the principal features of the event.

Musk said the Robovan can carry up to 20 passengers and can also be used to transport goods. TechCrunch said the vehicle had a "retro-futuristic look" with no steering wheel. As the van rolled towards the stage, Musk said "We're going to make this, and it's going to look like that." The Robovan is intended to operate on the Tesla Network, Tesla's ridehailing service for self-driving vehicles.

At the event, Musk did not say how much the Robovan would cost, how it would be produced, or when it would be released.

== Developments since the announcement ==
In February 2025 Tesla filed two U.S. trademark applications for the name "Robus", one covering electric vehicles and buses and the other covering ridesharing and vehicle-sharing services. On 4 August 2026 Tesla was granted U.S. design patent D1,138,869 for the vehicle's exterior, naming Franz von Holzhausen among the inventors.

== See also ==
- Tesla Cybercab
