= Texas Tax Code Chapter 313 =

Texas Economic Development Act

Texas Tax Code Chapter 313 (aka the Texas Economic Development Act) creates a state tax incentive program for certain large businesses to limit the appraised value of their property for the purposes of local Texas public school district property taxes.

An appraised value limitation is an agreement between a taxpayer and a Texas school district in which the taxpayer proposes to build or install property—and create jobs meeting certain job and wage requirements—in exchange for a ten-year limitation on the taxpayer's property value for school district maintenance and operations tax (M&O) purposes. For ten years, school M&O property taxes are not levied on the value in excess of the limitation amount. Limitation amounts are established by statute and vary by school district from $10 million to $100 million. Unlike abatements based on a percentage of the property value, the structure of the program benefits primarily extremely large projects. The majority of projects are in the petrochemical or energy sectors, although some are typical manufacturing.

Created by the Texas legislature in 2001, and initially set to expire in 2007, the program has been renewed several times. In 2013, the Texas Legislature reset the expiration date of the program to December 31, 2022.

Companies seeking a limitation submit an abatement application to the school district in which the project may be located. The school district forwards the application to the Texas Comptroller for evaluation. The school district may not grant final approval of the abatement without Comptroller analysis and approval. For the 10 years of the tax benefit period, reduced local school district revenues are substantially replaced with state funds through the state public school finance system.

The Texas Tax Code gives the Texas Comptroller's office responsibility and authority to adopt rules necessary for the implementation and administration of the program. The Comptroller's office delegates to school districts the responsibility to enforce provisions of the limitation agreements. In 2013, in House Bill 3390, the Texas legislature charged the Comptroller's office with reviewing the number of qualifying jobs created in future projects receiving tax limitations.

The Texas Comptroller's website posts documents related to the projects.

== Program Costs ==
A 2021 report to the Texas Legislature by the Texas Comptroller reported 509 active limitation agreements, representing an estimated $134 billion of total investment through 2019. That report indicates that for projects commencing between 2006 and 2020, local school property tax revenue reductions due to limitation agreements are approximately $10.8 billion.

A "Tax Exemptions and Tax Incidence Report" prepared by the Texas Comptroller in November, 2020, estimated that limitation agreements would reduce school districts revenues by $916 million in 2022, and over $1 billion in 2023.

== Program Supporters ==
Supporters of the program argue that Texas' high local property tax rates put the state at a disadvantage when competing for businesses making new investments. Business groups say tax abatements are largely responsible for the "Texas Miracle", attracting projects that would have not come to Texas otherwise. They say, without the 313 program, Texas cannot compete with other states for new business investment. Proponents of the program claim that local school district property revenue reductions created by the abatement do not create a real cost to the state, arguing that "but for" the program, none of the companies applying for the abatement would have located in Texas. Supporters further point out that the Chapter 313 program is extremely transparent, and that even with Chapter 313 agreements, schools' tax bases are increased. The Texas Comptroller of Public Accounts has said, "The temporary reduction in public school taxes may be followed by greater tax collections on a much more valuable property — in a healthier local economy."

== Program Critics ==
Critics of the program argue that many of the projects receiving the abatement would have located in Texas for other reasons. Elon Musk, in an interview after receiving a Chapter 313 limitation for his new Tesla Austin Gigafactory, said, "When talking to key members of the (Tesla) team that would need to move to Austin from California in order to get the factory going, Austin was their top pick, to be totally frank." Two large LNG projects are being built in Texas even after being refused Chapter 313 abatements by the local school district. Wind farms, critics say, find Texas an ideal location due to its rich wind resources, separate electrical grid, and large rate-payer-funded transmission networks. They say that the program's petrochemical projects locate in Texas largely because of little regulation, proximity to rich oil and gas shale plays, and access to deep-water ports and pipeline networks. Some critics also point to the relatively small number of jobs created compared to the large amount of revenues forgone for each job. Other critics point out that the taxable value of many Chapter 313 projects at the end of the 10-year abatement period is often far less than promised. They further claim program benefits are too generous, as many companies typically agree to return about 40 percent of the initial tax savings to the local school district through "payments in lieu of taxes" outside the regular system of school finance.

Program critics also argue the statute's requirement that the tax abatement be "a determining factor in the applicant's decision to invest capital and construct [a] project in Texas" is not the rigorous "but for" test legislative sponsors promised when the Chapter 313 program was revised and renewed in 2013 by the Texas legislature. The Senate sponsor of the 2013 legislation, Robert Deuell, said at the time, "We...have 'but for' provisions meaning that we really have to make sure that these projects would not have come to the state otherwise..." Texas House of Representatives bill sponsor Harvey Hilderbran explained, "If they [companies] were going to come here anyway, they wouldn't get it." But critics note that the Comptroller's office routinely approves projects after the applicant simply asserts that the project is not 'financially feasible' without the abatement. An article on the program published by the Texas Comptroller in November, 2020 noted, "It's generally impossible to determine the factors that ultimately cause a company to make a final decision, but it's plausible to assume that the availability of a large tax break is often a determining factor, if one of many."

== Program Studies and Analyses ==
In 2010, the Comptrollers office studied the program, making recommendations. The Texas Legislative Budget Board in its Texas State Government Effectiveness and Efficiency: Selected Issues and Recommendations (January 2011) analyzed the Chapter 313 program, making recommendations. In 2013, the Chapter was amended to require the Texas State Auditor's Office (SAO) to review at least three major limitation agreements annually. The SAO has published annual reports on selected agreements since 2014, but has never audited any company agreement-holders.

In November, 2016, the Texas Senate Committee on Natural Resources and Economic Development issued an Interim Report to the 85th Legislature that was extremely critical of the Chapter 313 program.

The Texas Comptroller of Public Accounts started issuing biennially reports on limitation economic development projects in 2008.

In 2017, University of Texas political science professor Nathan M. Jensen released a study on the Chapter 313 program suggesting that 85 percent of the companies receiving the abatement would have located in Texas for other reasons.

== 2019 Legislation ==
During the Texas 86th Legislature (2019), state representative Jim Murphy (Houston) filed House Bill 2129 to extend the expiration of the Chapter 313 program from December 31, 2022 to December 31, 2032. The Texas Legislative Budget Board estimated the local school district revenue losses to be approximately $10 billion between 2023 and the year 2049. In a March 20 House Ways and Means committee hearing, representatives of about 50 companies and 40 economic development groups testified or registered for the bill. Five witnesses testified or registered against the bill. On April 9, House Bill 2129 was voted out of the Texas House of Representatives 115 to 28, with 91% of the Democrats and 66% of the Republicans voting for the measure. The bill died in Senate committee.

== 2021 Legislation - Program Expiration ==
During the Texas 87th Legislature (2021), several bills were filed to extend the program's expiration date from December 31, 2022 to December 31, 2032. Among those bills, HB 1556 (Murphy) would also have allowed tax benefits for project renovations, but that bill died in the Texas House. After left-wing and right-wing opposition, as well as a number of news articles and editorials in state newspapers and magazines criticizing the program, no bill extending Chapter 313 passed the Texas Senate. In November of 2021, the State Comptroller proposed rules to reduce reporting requirements for existing projects. Public comments on the rules proposal were almost unanimously opposed to revising program reporting requirements.

== See also ==
- Tax abatement
- Property tax in the United States
- Texas Comptroller of Public Accounts
- Economic development
