= Tesla Robotaxi =

Ride-hailing service operated by Tesla, Inc.

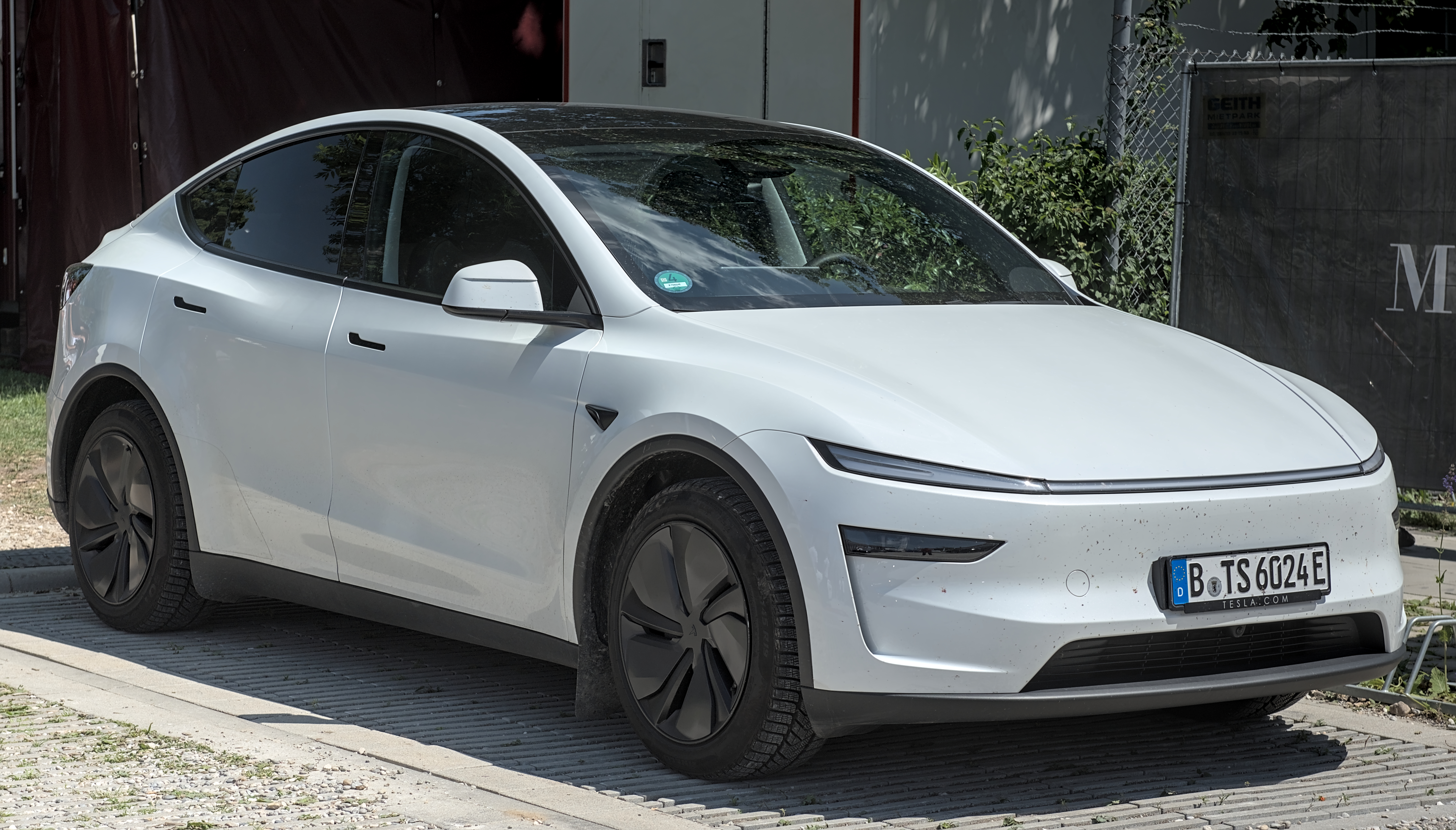
- A Tesla Model Y, the initial Tesla vehicle in Robotaxi service
- Developer: Tesla, Inc.
- Country: United States
- Year introduced: 2025
- Type: Autonomous ride-hailing
- Purpose: Commercial transportation, Technology demonstrator
- Website: www.tesla.com/robotaxi

Tesla Robotaxi is a ride-hailing service operated by Tesla, Inc. that uses vehicles running the company's Full Self-Driving software. Limited service began in Austin, Texas, on June 22, 2025. As of November 2026 it operates with autonomous vehicles in Texas (Austin, Dallas, Fort Worth, Houston, San Antonio) and Florida (Miami, Orlando and Tampa), and with a safety supervisor in the San Francisco Bay Area. The fleet is primarily Tesla Model Y vehicles; purpose-built Tesla Cybercab vehicles were added in Austin on September 3, 2026, and account for half the fleet in Texas at the end of October 2026. As of October 2026, over 3.3 million unsupervised miles have been driven in Tesla Robotaxis.

The service represents a key part of Tesla CEO Elon Musk's long-term strategy for the company, which envisions a future where Tesla owners can add their personal vehicles to a shared autonomous ride-hailing network. The launch in Austin attracted significant media attention and scrutiny, with early riders documenting incidents such as the vehicle driving on the wrong side of the road, phantom braking, dropping passengers off in intersections and committing traffic violations that led to an investigation by the National Highway Traffic Safety Administration.

Tesla plans to have the Robotaxi network work with all current Tesla vehicles, starting with its Model Y and Cybercab vehicles. During Tesla's October 2024 We, Robot event it also demonstrated the Robovan which it plans to build and add to the network, but no timelines were given.

== History and concept ==
Elon Musk first mentioned a future car sharing service for Tesla cars with autonomous control capability in 2016. He stated that the car could generate income for the owner while the owner pursued other activities, and said that all new Tesla cars were being built with the necessary hardware for "full self-driving capability." In 2018, Musk indicated that the service would compete directly with companies like Uber and Lyft, but the Robotaxi network would be composed exclusively of autonomous electric vehicles.

In April 2019, at Tesla's "Autonomy Day," Musk predicted that Tesla would have one million robotaxis on the road by 2020. He said the vehicles would be "feature-complete on full self-driving" by the end of 2019 and would not require driver oversight by the second quarter of 2020. He also said that costs for car owners who allow their vehicles to be part of the network would be under US$.20 per mile ($0.12/km), versus $2 to $3/mi ($1.2 to $1.9/km) of traditional driver-operated ridesharing services.

In October 2020, Tesla released its "Full Self-Driving (Beta)" software, as a beta feature to a small set of users. As of July 2026, the software is now "Full Self-Driving (supervised)", and is available in the United States and some other countries.

In August 2024, Tesla unveiled a design for a purpose-built robotaxi, later dubbed the "Cybercab," a two-seater vehicle with no steering wheel or pedals. Musk stated it would be cheaper to ride in a Cybercab than to take the bus. Tesla said on October 23, 2024, during its investor call, that a Tesla ridehailing app has been in internal testing since early 2024, exclusively with Tesla employees in California, using driver-supervised Model 3 and Model Y vehicles.

In June 2025, the service is launched with human safety monitors using modified Tesla Model Y vehicles.

In January 2026, the service began to integrate unsupervised vehicles into its fleet in a limited manner, and stated it planned to expand to seven additional cities in the first half of 2026. In February 2026, Tesla said it planned to begin volume production of its purpose-built Cybercab in April 2026. In April 2026, the service expanded to Dallas and Houston in Texas with unsupervised vehicles. In July 2026, the service expanded to Miami, Orlando, and Tampa with unsupervised vehicles outside of Texas for the first time. In November 2026, service was expanded to Fort Worth and San Antonio.

In September 2026, the service began to rollout their purpose built vehicle, the Tesla Cybercab. This vehicle features no manual controls and only two seats with the goal of optimizing production and operational costs. Cybercab rollout initially began in Austin with plans to expand to additional cities within their network in the near future.

== Services ==
When Cybercab rides began in Austin on September 3, 2026, Tesla had 45 Cybercabs registered in Texas, within a Texas robotaxi fleet of about 420 vehicles, mostly Tesla Model Ys. By October 21, Texas Department of Motor Vehicles records showed 449 Cybercabs and 362 Model Ys authorized for driverless operation in the state.

In November 2026, Tesla expanded unsupervised Model Y service to Fort Worth on November 2 and San Antonio on November 9, transitioned all eight of its active markets across Texas and Florida to 24-hour daily operations on November 12, and began offering public Cybercab rides in Dallas on November 19—making Dallas the second city after Austin to deploy the two-seat, steering-wheel-free vehicle.

Service areas in the United States
State	Metro area	Status	Launch date	Area	Ref.
Arizona	Phoenix	Service announced		—	
California	San Francisco Bay Area	Safety-driver service	July 30, 2025	1,096 sq mi (2,839 km^{2})	
Florida	Jacksonville	Service announced		—	
Florida	Miami	Unsupervised service	July 3, 2026	59 sq mi (153 km^{2})	
Florida	Orlando	Unsupervised service	July 21, 2026	26 sq mi (67 km^{2})	
Florida	Tampa Bay	Unsupervised service	July 21, 2026	24 sq mi (62 km^{2})	
Nevada	Las Vegas	Approved, not launched		—	
Texas	Austin	Unsupervised service	June 22, 2025	443 sq mi (1,147 km^{2})	
Texas	Dallas	Unsupervised service	April 18, 2026	81 sq mi (210 km^{2})	
Texas	Fort Worth	Unsupervised service	November 2, 2026	144 sq mi (373 km^{2})	
Texas	Houston	Unsupervised service	April 18, 2026	254 sq mi (658 km^{2})	
Texas	San Antonio	Unsupervised service	November 9, 2026	274 sq mi (710 km^{2})	

== Public and media reception ==
Reaction to the June 2025 launch was mixed. Wedbush analyst Dan Ives, who took two rides at the launch event, described the experience as "comfortable," "safe" and "completely smooth," writing that "this is the future." Other analysts were more cautious: Guggenheim's Ronald Jewsikow called the launch "baby steps," and Barclays' Dan Levy cautioned "against overoptimism" about the pace of scaling.

Invited riders, who CNBC reported were mostly promoters of Tesla's products, stock and Musk, posted videos of trouble-free rides. Other videos showed robotaxis entering the wrong lane, speeding, braking suddenly and dropping passengers off in intersections. Experts quoted by Reuters differed: Carnegie Mellon's Philip Koopman said it was "awfully early to have a bunch of videos of erratic and poor driving," while Princeton's Alain Kornhauser said the car "handled the situations very well." CNBC wrote that the launch "fell shy of fulfilling Musk's many driverless promises over the past decade."

When Tesla began running some Austin vehicles without an in-car safety monitor in January 2026, CNBC noted the company had fallen far short of its 2025 expansion goals, and Deutsche Bank analysts said the rollout had been "clearly tracking behind schedule." That month, Electrek estimated from NHTSA crash reports and Tesla's disclosed mileage that the fleet had about one crash per 55,000 miles, versus about one police-reported crash per 500,000 miles for U.S. human drivers, while noting that counting unreported crashes puts the human figure nearer one per 200,000 miles.

Reviews of the Cybercab after its September 2026 Austin launch were also mixed. The Verge called the ride "welcomely smooth" but criticized long waits, awkward drop-off spots and hesitant driving, and CNBC reported passenger complaints about wait times, wrong-place drop-offs and door problems.

== Regulatory response ==
Videos of the robotaxis' performance issues that circulated online caught the attention of U.S. federal regulators. On June 23, 2025, one day after the service launched, the National Highway Traffic Safety Administration (NHTSA) said, "NHTSA is aware of the referenced incidents and is in contact with the manufacturer to gather additional information."

On September 3, 2026, NHTSA opened an audit into Tesla's self-certification that the Cybercab complies with applicable Federal Motor Vehicle Safety Standards after the vehicle entered paid service in Austin.

In October 2026 it was reported that the NHTSA was investigating allegations that the Tesla Robotaxis fail to follow school zone speed restrictions.

== Competitive landscape ==
Tesla's main competitor is Waymo, and the two companies take different approaches to sensing. Waymo and other competitors such as Zoox use lidar, while Tesla's Robotaxi relies on eight cameras and artificial intelligence software. As of October 2026, Tesla's Robotaxi operated without an in-vehicle safety supervisor in eight U.S. metropolitan areas (Austin, Dallas, Fort Worth, Houston, Miami, Orlando, San Antonio and Tampa), while its San Francisco Bay Area service still used a safety driver in every car. According to Electrek, most of its service areas cover only small parts of those cities.

Waymo said in October 2026 that it completes more than 500,000 paid rides per week, and Alphabet CEO Sundar Pichai said it operates in 15 major U.S. cities. Other competitors include Amazon's Zoox, which began charging for rides in Las Vegas in August 2026.

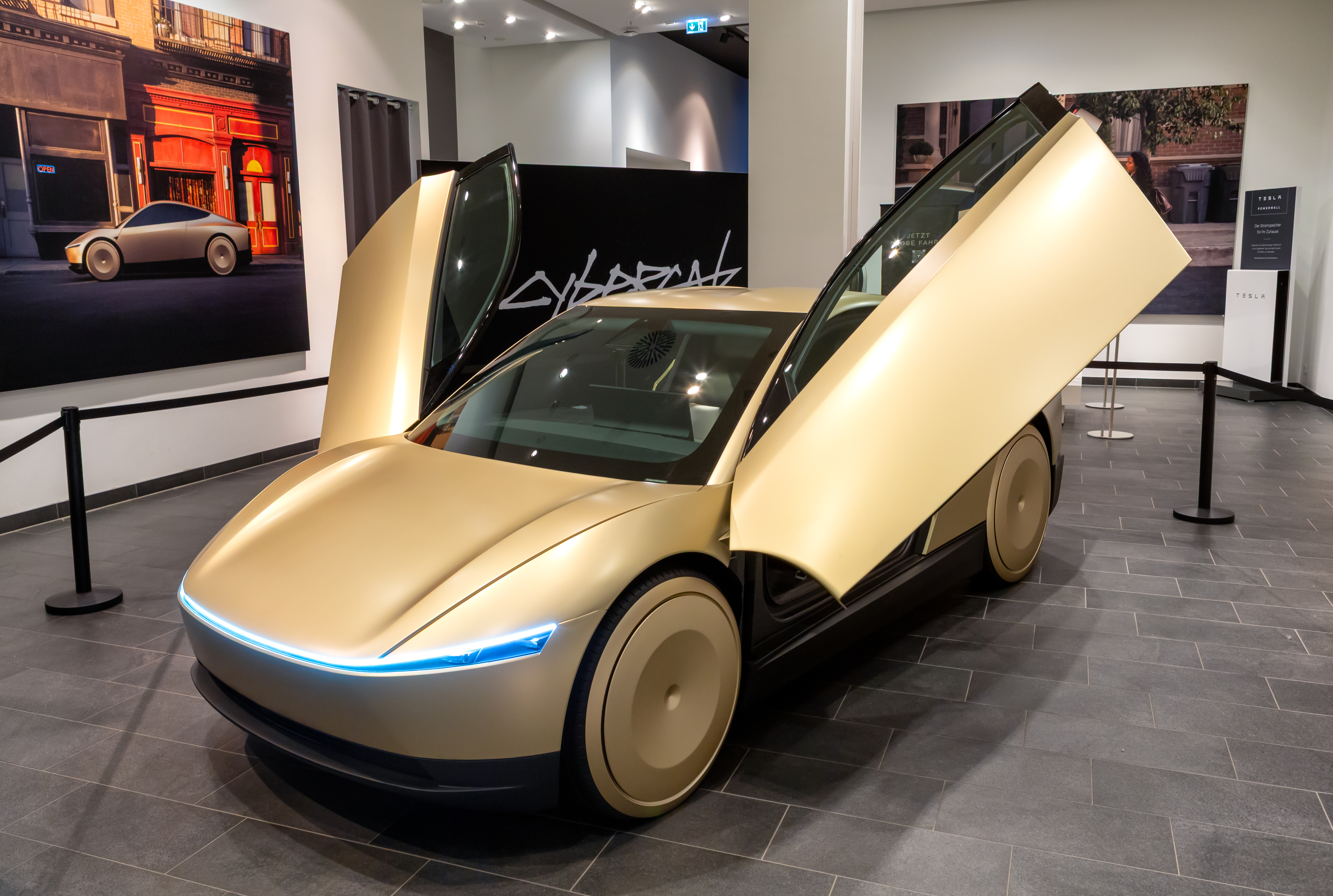
Concept model of the Cybercab in 2024
