= Franz von Holzhausen =

American vehicle designer (born 1968)

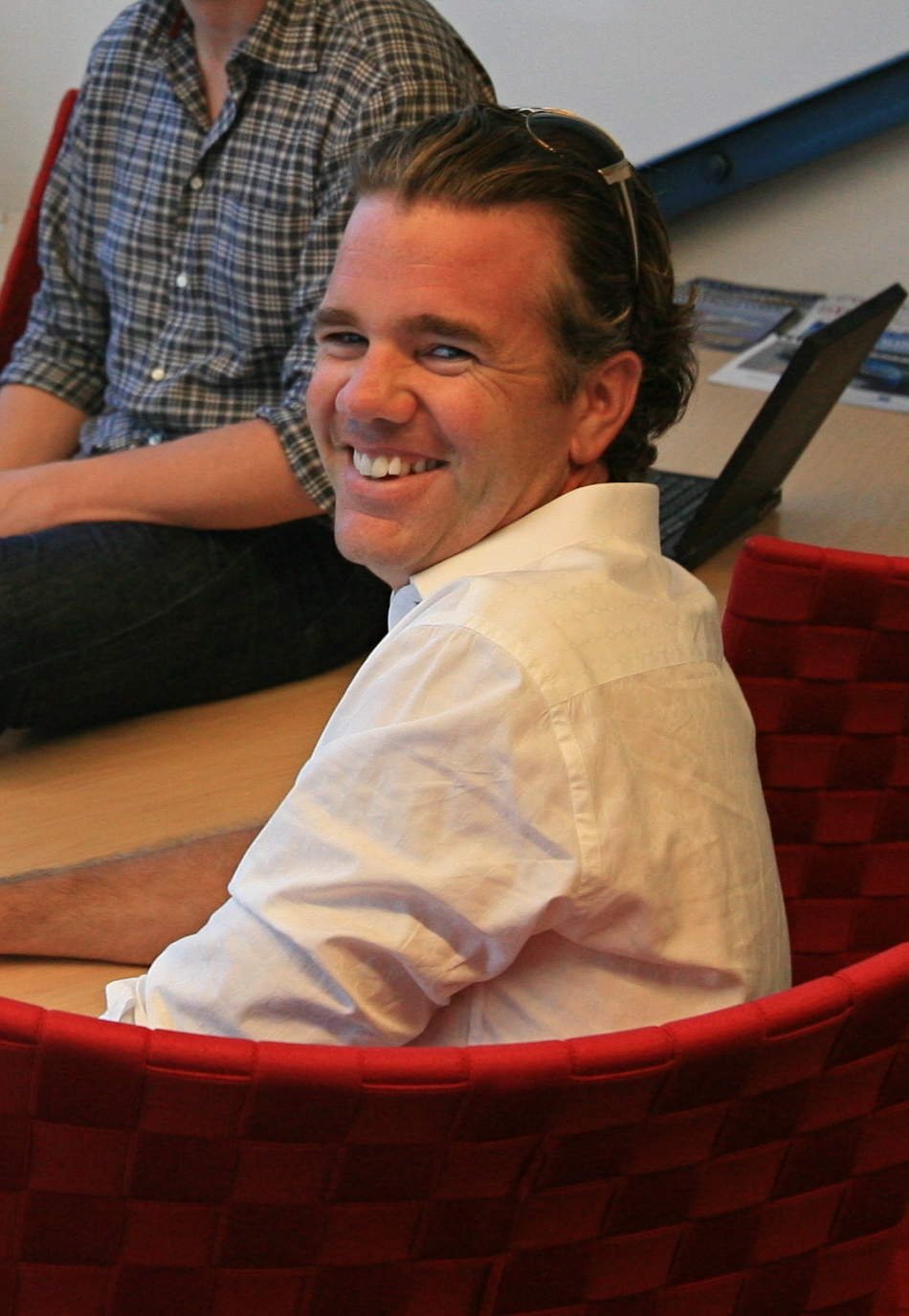
- von Holzhausen in 2008
- Born: May 10, 1968 (age 58); Simsbury, Connecticut, U.S.
- Education: Syracuse University; ArtCenter College of Design
- Occupations: Chief Designer, Tesla Inc.
- Years active: 1992–present
- Spouse: Vicki Vlachakis
- Children: 2

Franz von Holzhausen (born May 10, 1968) is an American automobile designer. He has been the chief designer at Tesla, Inc. since 2008, where he has led the design of multiple production and concept vehicles, including the Model S, Model X, Model 3, Model Y, Semi, Cybertruck, and second-generation Roadster. He previously held design roles at Volkswagen, General Motors, and Mazda.

== Early life and education ==
Von Holzhausen was born in Simsbury, Connecticut. His father, Frank, is also a designer. He attended Syracuse University for two years before transferring to the ArtCenter College of Design in Pasadena, California.

== Career ==
Von Holzhausen began his career at Volkswagen in 1992, contributing to the "Concept One" project, which later evolved into the Volkswagen New Beetle.

In 2000, he joined General Motors as a design manager, where his work included the Saturn Sky and Pontiac Solstice.

Von Holzhausen became design director at Mazda in 2005. He led the development of several concept cars, including the Mazda Kabura, which debuted at the 2006 North American International Auto Show, and the Mazda Furai, revealed at the 2008 show.

In 2008, von Holzhausen joined Tesla, Inc. as chief designer. He led the design of the Model S, Model X, Model 3, Model Y, and Semi. He also led the design of the Cybertruck, including its high-profile 2019 unveiling event. He led design of the Cybercab robotaxi, unveiled at Tesla's "We, Robot" event in October 2024. He was among the Tesla executives at the October 2026 unveiling of the production second-generation Roadster, which Tesla said would enter production in 2028.

== Personal life ==
He is married to Vicki von Holzhausen (née Vlachakis), a former automotive designer who is now the founder and CEO of von Holzhausen, a company focused on sustainable materials.
