= Apolong =

Chinese driverless vehicle

Apollo (Apolong 阿波龙)
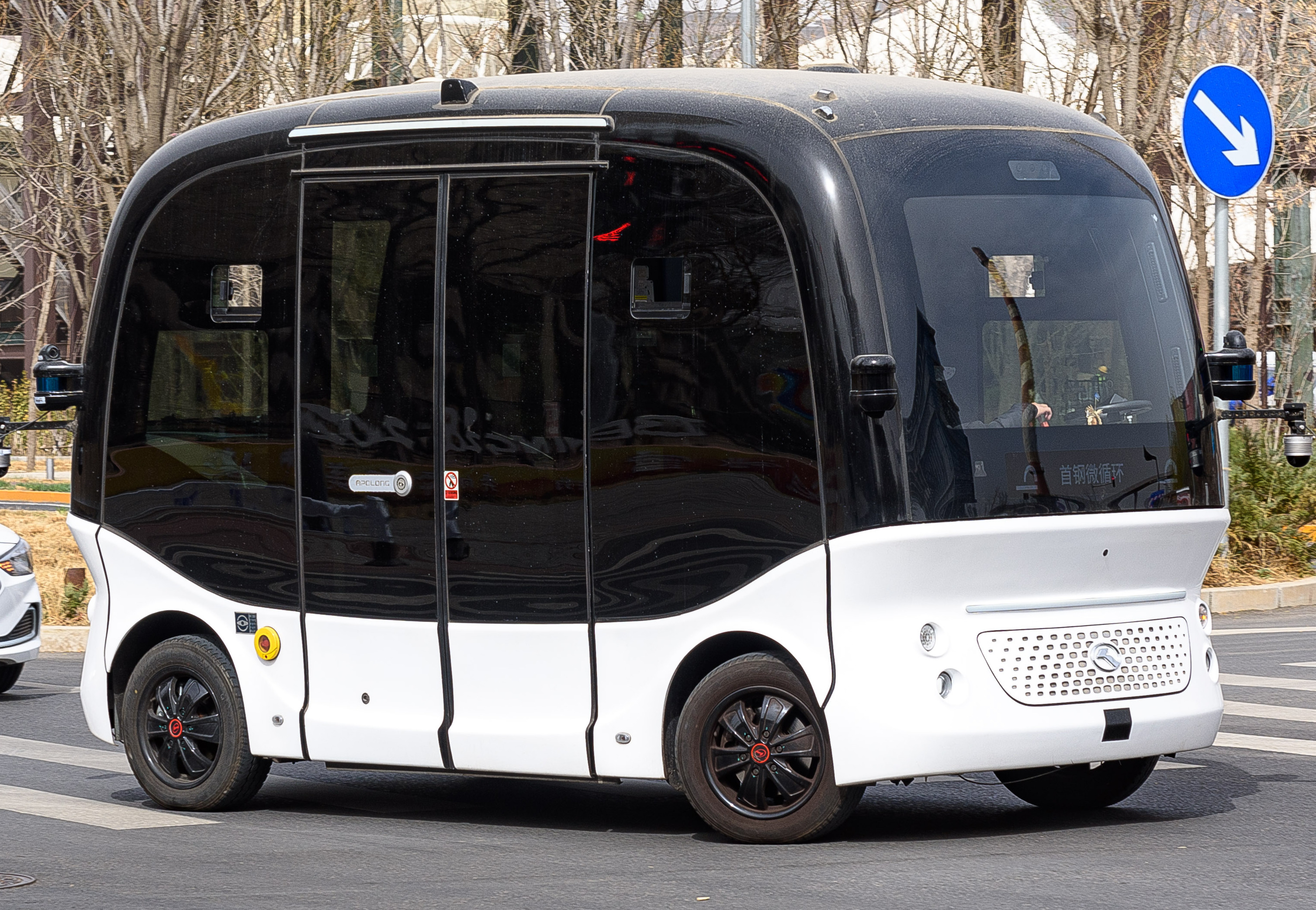
- An Apolong bus in Shougang Park, Beijing

Overview
- Manufacturer: Baidu, King Long
- Production: 2017–present

Body and chassis
- Class: Driverless vehicle

The Apolong (Chinese: 阿波龙), sometimes referred to as the Baidu Apollo project, is a driverless vehicle developed by Baidu, King Long and a consortium of more than 40 companies.

The SAE Level 4 microcirculation Apolong bus commenced mass production in 2017. It is manufactured by a consortium consisting of Baidu, King Long and SB Drive (a subsidiary of Softbank). The driverless bus does not have a steering wheel, accelerator or brake, travels at speeds of 20 to 40 km/h and is able to sense and predict movement of pedestrians and vehicles in its vicinity. It uses Apollo 3.0, Baidu's open source driverless operating platform.

The name Apollo is an English version of the Chinese name for the bus "Apolong".

== History ==
In 2013, Baidu commenced development of autonomous driverless vehicles, through the baidu research institute. This project gradually expanded to including 10,000 developers working on an open platform, and more than 50 partners across the world, including Intel, BMW, Benz, Kinglong and XTE. On 5 July 2017, Bloomberg reported that Baidu had negotiated 50 partners to sign in for the development and purchase of the new unmanned buses.

In 2017, China Daily reported that four Apolong buses were planned for test rides on two bus routes in Shenzhen. In August 2017, an early version of the autonomous vehicle was unveiled at GoMentum, US. In July 2018, at Baidu Createfest 2018 held in Beijing, Baidu and King Long unveiled the latest version of Apolong. They announced plans of using these buses in specific regions of Wuhan, Xiamen, Shenzhen, Beijing, and Pingtan. In July 2018, China org reported that test drives had been carried out in Chongqing and Fujian. In July 2018, Xinhua and New Atlas reported that the buses had commenced mass production as the 100th Apolong bus was rolled out. The bus was first introduced to an international audience in November 2018 at the Shanghai World Expo, where 1600 participants from 72 countries were ushered to the venue in Apolong buses.

== Specifications ==
Apolong buses can carry 14 people (8 seated and 6 standing), are guided through cloud technology, have a wheel span of 4.3 metres (14 ft), are SAE level 4 capable. It uses the Kunlun microchip developed by Baidu.

== Production locations ==
As of November 2018, Apolong buses are assembled in Kinglong's manufacturing premises in Xiamen, Fujian.

== See also ==
- Vehicular automation#Shared autonomous vehicles
