= Fretter (surname) =

Fretter is a surname. Notable people with the surname include:

- Colton Fretter (born 1982), Canadian professional ice hockey forward
- Vera Fretter (1905–1992), British conchologist, and one of the authors (with Alastair Graham) of British Prosobranch Molluscs

== See also ==
- Fret (disambiguation)
- Fretter, an electronics and major appliance retailer based out of Detroit, Michigan, founded in the 1950s by Oliver "Ollie" Fretter
- Otto Fretter-Pico (1893–1966), highly decorated major-general in the Wehrmacht during World War II
- Maximilian Fretter-Pico (1892–1984), German general during World War II
