= Cyclops Steel =

Former steel company based in Pittsburgh, Pennsylvania, United States

- Trade name: Universal Rolling Mill Company (1908–1936); Universal-Cyclops
- Industry: Steel; Lumber; Electronics retail
- Founded: 1908; 118 years ago in Bridgeville, Pennsylvania
- Defunct: February 1987
- Fate: Acquired by Alleghany Corporation, Silo and Busy Beaver subsidiaries sold to Dixons Group Ltd.
- Successor: Universal Stainless & Alloy (Aperam)
- Headquarters: Pittsburgh, Pennsylvania, United States
- Key people: William H. Knoell (chairman and CEO)
- Subsidiaries: Detroit Steel; Silo; Busy Beaver

Cyclops Steel (also known as Universal-Cyclops and for one of its main subsidiaries as Detroit Steel) was a steel company based in Pittsburgh, Pennsylvania.

== Overview ==
Cyclops Steel marketed to industries such as aerospace, automotive, business machines, chemical processing, communications equipment, construction, electronics, farm machinery, food processing equipment, home appliances and cutlery, industrial machinery, marine equipment, medical equipment, drilling and mining equipment, military equipment, power generation equipment, rail transportation, sports equipment and tools, ties and fixtures.

Not to be confused with Cyclops Steel Works in Sheffield, UK in the mid 1800s.

== History ==
The company was founded in nearby Bridgeville, Pennsylvania in 1908 as Universal Rolling Mill Company, and merged with Cyclops Steel Company founded in 1884 of the Western Pennsylvania city of Titusville in 1936.

In 1970, Cyclops Corporation acquired Detroit Steel. Led by Chairman and CEO William H. Knoell, Cyclops purchased the Clairton, Pennsylvania based 16-chain Busy Beaver lumber stores in 1972, and the Silo Electronic Stores in 1980 for $35 million ($155 million in today's terms).

Cyclops and Colt's Manufacturing Company entered into a public battle for a Colt steel mill in Midland, Pennsylvania during 1982. In 1984, the company split its specialty steel division into two separate subsidiaries : sheet and strip (Coshocton Stainless Division) and bars (Cytemp Specialty Steel Division). It also tried to block the mega-merger of LTV and Republic Steel. In August, 1986 Cyclops shareholders rejected selling off its core steel mill business in favor of a management suggested re-focusing only on Silo & Busy Beaver retail stores. Still in 1986, Cyclops acquired Eastern Stainless Steel.

In February 1987, Cyclops Steel was bought out by Alleghany Corporation for $494 million ($1.45 billion in today's terms), as its 119-store Silo electronics outlets and 11-store Busy Beaver retailers are spun off into British based Dixons Group Ltd.

In 1992, a group of former managers of Cyclops Steel formed a new company, Universal Stainless & Alloy, and bought out the former Cyclops Steel mills in Bridgeville and Titusville in 1994. Cyclops merged with Armco Inc. and became a subsidiary of the latter. As of 2023, these mills remain in operation under Universal Stainless.

In January 2025, Universal Stainless & Alloy was purchased by Luxembourg-based Aperam.

== Notable visits ==
- In 1952: Dutch Prime Minister Willem Drees opened the second day of his three-day visit, stopping at the Cyclops Steel mill near Pittsburgh.
- April, 1980: Senator and 1980 presidential candidate Edward Kennedy visits the Bridgeville, Pennsylvania mill on a campaign stop.
