= Tesla Cybertruck =

Electric pickup truck

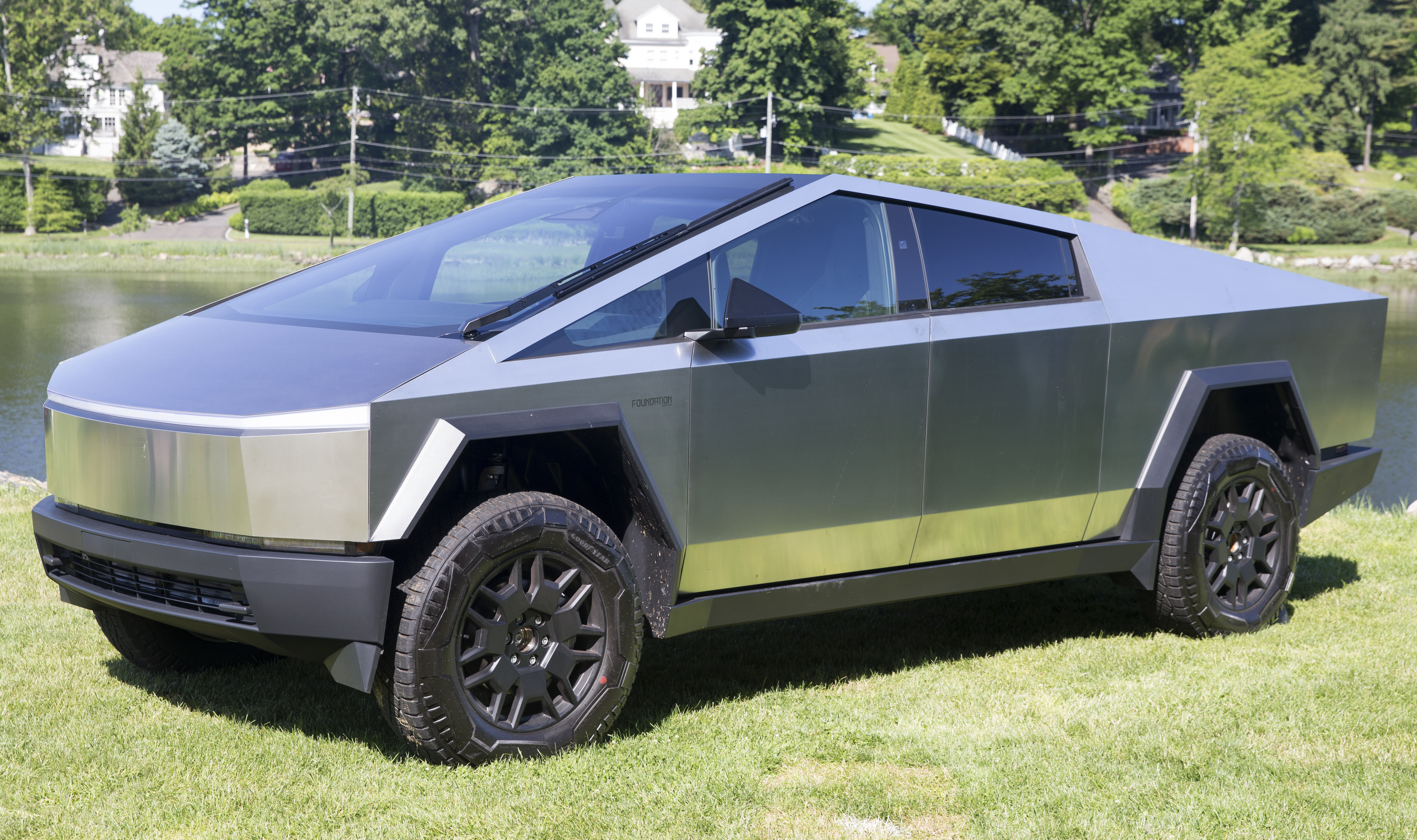
- 2024 Tesla Cybertruck, Foundation Series

Overview
- Manufacturer: Tesla, Inc.
- Production: November 2023 – present
- Model years: 2024–2027
- Assembly: United States: Austin, Texas (Gigafactory Texas)
- Designer: Franz von Holzhausen

Body and chassis
- Class: Full-size pickup truck
- Body style: 4-door crew cab
- Layout: Rear motor, rear-wheel drive; Dual- or tri-motor, all-wheel drive

Powertrain
- Electric motor: RWD: Permanent magnet; AWD: Induction (front), permanent magnet (rear); Cyberbeast: Permanent magnet (front), 2 × induction (rear)
- Transmission: Single-speed fixed (15:1 ratio)
- Battery: 123 kWh lithium-ion (816 V, 150 Ah)
- Electric range: 301–362 mi (484–583 km) EPA est.
- Plug-in charging: AC onboard charger: 11.5 kW at 240 V, 48 A; DC: ≤250 kW at 400 V; ≤350 kW at 800 V; NACS connector

Dimensions
- Wheelbase: 143.11 in (3,635 mm)
- Length: 223.74 in (5,683 mm)
- Width: 79.99 in (2,032 mm)
- Height: 70.7 in (1,796 mm)
- Curb weight: AWD: 6,660 lb (3,020 kg); Cyberbeast: 6,901 lb (3,130 kg)

The Tesla Cybertruck is a battery-electric full-size pickup truck manufactured by Tesla, Inc. since 2023. It was presented as a prototype concept in November 2019, with an angular design composed of flat, unpainted stainless steel body panels, drawing comparisons to low-polygon computer models.

While scheduled for production in late 2021, the vehicle had multiple delays before entering limited production at Gigafactory Texas in 2023, with customer deliveries beginning in November 2023. As of 2026, two variants are available: a tri-motor all-wheel drive (AWD) model marketed as the "Cyberbeast" with an estimated range of 320 miles (515 km) and a dual-motor AWD model with an EPA-rated range of 325 miles (525 km).

As of 2026, the Cybertruck is marketed in the United States, Mexico, Canada, South Korea, Qatar, the United Arab Emirates, and Saudi Arabia. The Cybertruck has been extensively criticized for its production quality issues, unusual appearance, and safety problems. In response to its disappointing sales, multiple news publications have described it as an "automotive flop". In November 2026, Tesla announced they would wind down Cybertruck production at the Austin, Texas, factory starting around mid-2027; CNN noted it was not immediately clear whether Tesla would move production elsewhere or phase the truck out entirely.

== History ==
=== Background ===
Tesla CEO Elon Musk presented his ideas in 2012, envisioning building a "Tesla supertruck with crazy torque, dynamic air suspension, and corners like it's on rails". In a 2014 interview with CNN, Musk said a Tesla pickup equivalent to the Ford F-150 could be available in four to five years.

In mid-2016, the outline for a consumer pickup truck was included in part 2 of the Tesla Master Plan. Musk suggested that the same chassis could be used for a van and a pickup truck. In late 2017, Musk teased the picture of a "pickup truck that can carry a pickup truck" at the official reveal for the Tesla Semi and the new Roadster.

In late 2018, Musk anticipated that a prototype would be ready to show in 2019.

In March 2019, following the Tesla Model Y launch, Musk distributed a teaser image of a vehicle described as having a cyberpunk or Blade Runner style, resembling a futuristic armored personnel carrier. It was rumored to be named the Model B. In November 2019, Tesla filed for a trademark on "CYBRTRK", but the United States Patent and Trademark Office application was abandoned in August 2020 after Tesla did not respond to an office action.

In mid-2019, the towing capacity of the vehicle was stated to meet or exceed that of a Ford F-150. At the same meeting, Musk said Tesla had a design for a "submarine car" that could appear as a show car.

In July 2019, regarding a release date, Musk stated "We're close, but the magic is in the final details. Maybe 2 to 3 months", indicating late 2019. The unveiling was then scheduled for November 21, 2019, at the Tesla Design Studio, next to the SpaceX headquarters in Los Angeles. The truck was launched under the graffiti-themed logo of "Cybertruck", and a new trademark request was filed with the graffiti logo.

=== 2019 concept ===
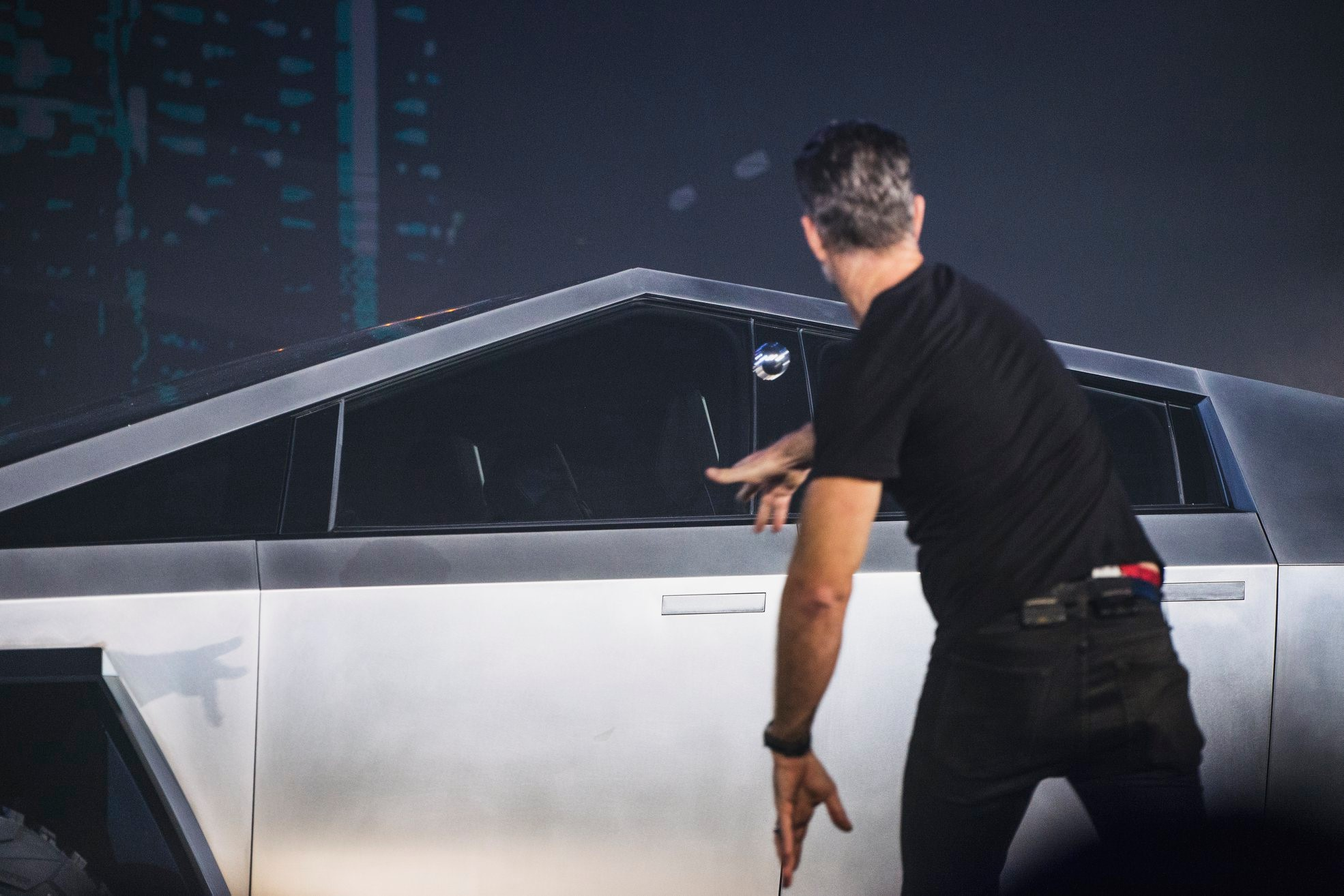
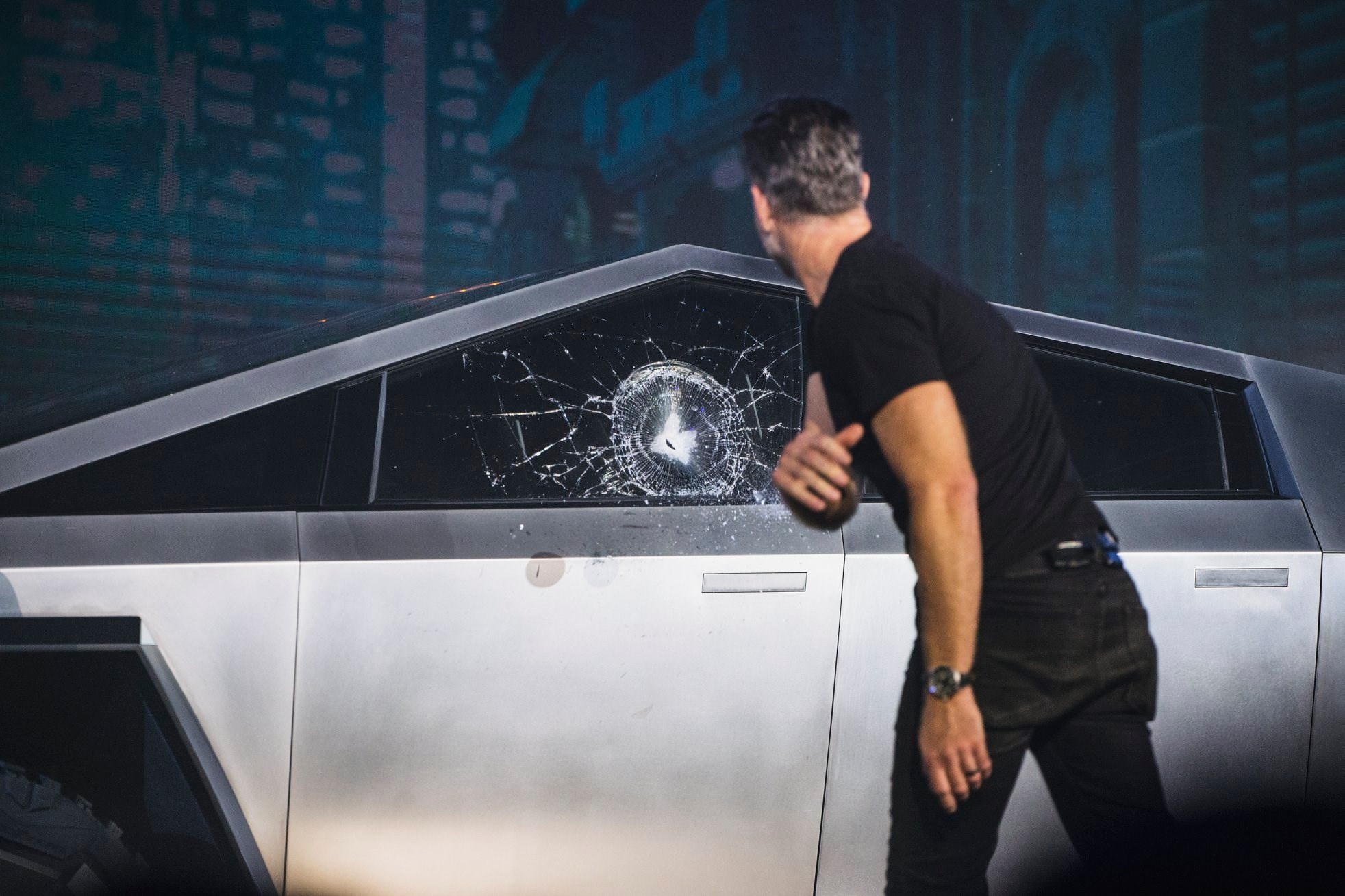
The window damage caused by the steel ball impacting during the unveiling event

A Cybertruck concept was unveiled in Los Angeles, California, on November 21, 2019 — the same month, year, and location in which the 1982 film Blade Runner was set. The Cybertruck was launched under a graffiti-themed "Cybertruck" logo.

During the unveiling, Tesla claimed that the Cybertruck's "Armor Glass" windows were virtually unbreakable, but the two windows on the truck shattered when Franz von Holzhausen threw a metal ball at each of them. Musk later stated that the windows were damaged because, in an earlier demonstration, the door had been hit by a sledgehammer that cracked the base of the glass. Tesla released a video of the Cybertruck pulling a rear-wheel-drive Ford F-150 uphill in a tug of war. News outlets pointed out this was due to the Cybertruck's heavier weight.

In a 2018 interview with Kara Swisher, Musk said Tesla wanted to get "gasoline, diesel pickup trucks off the road".

At the end of the presentation, a Tesla Cyberquad all-terrain vehicle (ATV) concept was driven onto the bed of the Cybertruck using a built-in ramp in the tailgate. The Cyberquad was plugged into the Cybertruck's onboard power outlet to charge its batteries. The ATV was anticipated for sale as a Cybertruck option.

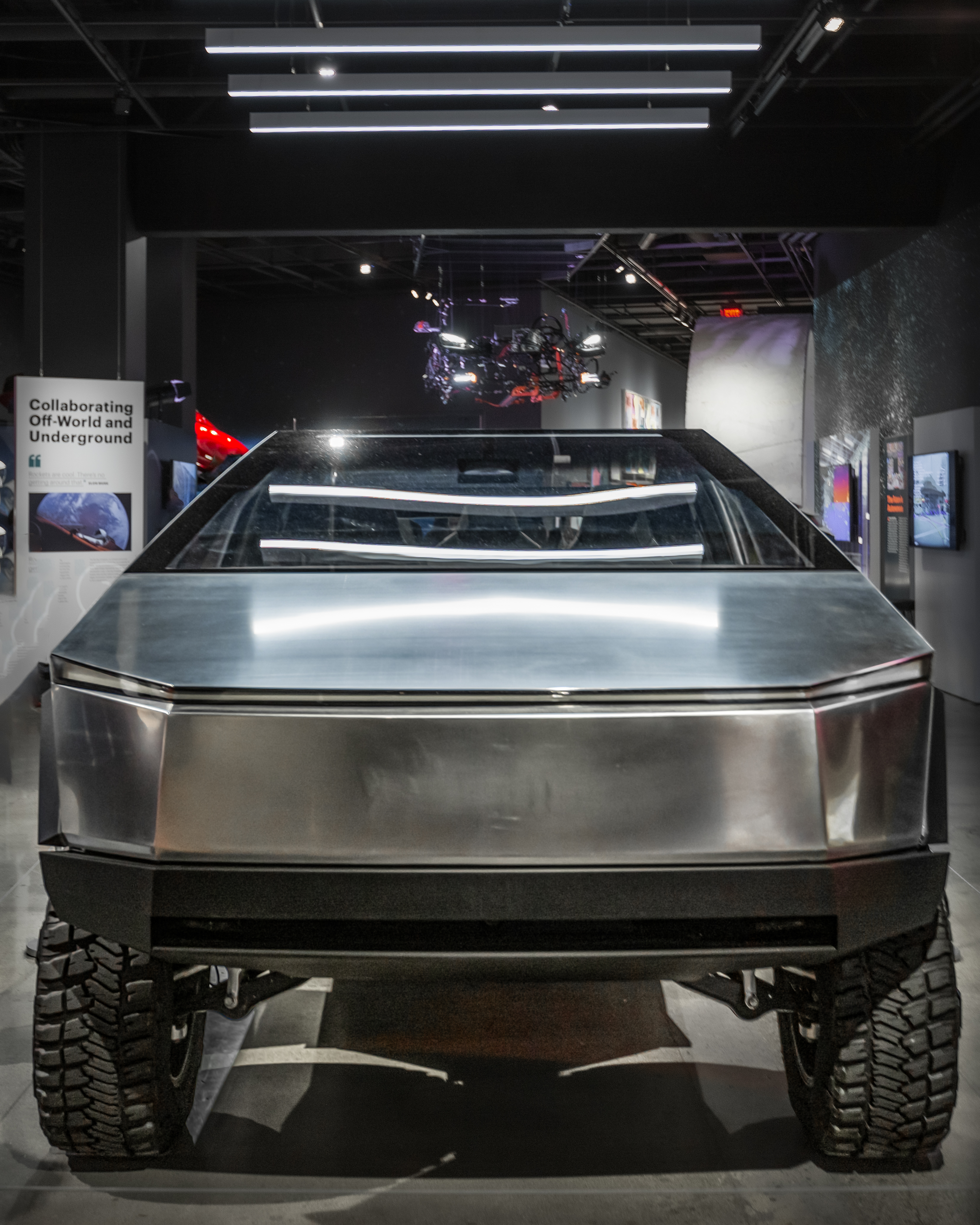
Cybertruck prototype on display at the Petersen Automotive Museum

In 2019, many social media commentators criticized the sharp contours and unusual exterior shown in the concept vehicle. The prototype was exhibited at the Petersen Automotive Museum in June 2020 and again in November 2022.

In January 2020, The Automobile magazine named Cybertruck the 2019 "Concept Car of the Year".

=== Reservations ===
Beginning in November 2019, Tesla accepted Cybertruck reservations with a refundable US$100 deposit. On November 26, Musk announced 250,000 preorders in the five days since the unveiling.

In October 2021, Tesla removed the Cybertruck's pricing and specifications from its website without explanation, while still accepting deposits. At the 2022 annual shareholders meeting, Musk stated that final specifications and pricing would be different from those unveiled for the concept vehicle in 2019.

Preorders were temporarily shut down prior to the November 30, 2023, delivery event. The price for a deposit was increased to $250 after the event. In August 2024, the Cybertruck was readily available for delivery in the U.S., and Tesla shut down the reservation process.

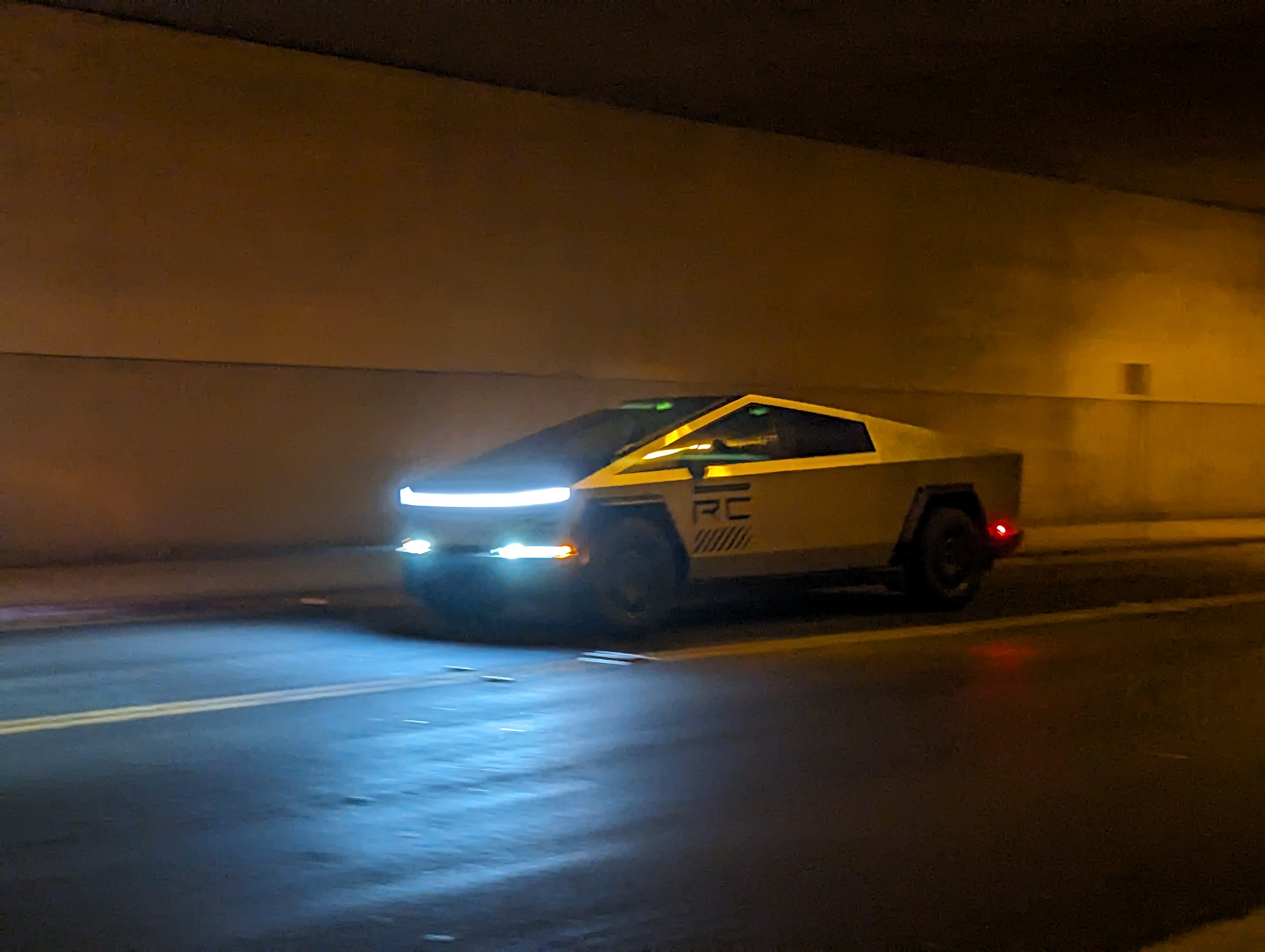
Release Candidate testing in San Mateo, California, during October 2023

=== Production and offerings ===
In November 2019, Elon Musk announced that the Cybertruck production would launch in late 2021 with a starting price of $39,900 and offer more configurations in 2022. The release date was later delayed to 2022, and subsequently to late 2023, with an updated base price of US$60,990. In May 2022, Tesla stopped taking orders from customers outside North America, and in December 2023, it confirmed that the Cybertruck would be available exclusively in North America. While individual imports into the European Union and United Kingdom are possible, type approval restrictions prevent registration for public road use in many countries.

In June 2023, chief designer Franz von Holzhausen drove an early build Cybertruck to an event at the Petersen Automotive Museum. The first unit was assembled at Gigafactory Texas in July 2023.

Serial production began by November 2023, with production-specification units appearing in Tesla showrooms later that month. On November 30, 2023, Tesla hosted a delivery event at Gigafactory Texas. The event featured a demonstration of the vehicle's armored glass withstanding a baseball thrown by von Holzhausen, and a promotional video showing the Cybertruck winning a drag race against a Porsche 911 while towing another 911. Although Musk said the race occurred over 1/4 mile (0.4 km), analysis of the footage suggested it was likely 1/8 mile (0.2 km).

At the same event, Tesla announced pricing and specifications for three variants: a single-motor rear-wheel drive (RWD), a dual-motor all-wheel drive (AWD), and a tri-motor AWD model branded as the "Cyberbeast". The RWD variant, priced at $60,990, was scheduled for release in 2025 with an estimated range of 250 miles (400 km). The dual-motor AWD model was planned for 2024 at $79,990, with a range of 340 miles (550 km) and a top speed of 112 mph (180 km/h). The tri-motor Cyberbeast, also scheduled for 2024, was priced at $99,990, with a range of 320 miles (510 km) and a top speed of 130 mph (210 km/h). Compared to initial projections in 2019, prices had increased by $21,000–30,000, representing a 43–60% price increase.

By August 2024, Tesla no longer offered the base RWD model on its website. Until October 2024, only the Foundation Series was sold, at a $20,000 premium that bundled Full Self-Driving and a credit for Powershare hardware.

Sales of the RWD model, rebranded as the "Long Range" Cybertruck, resumed in April 2025. Now with a range of 350 miles (560 km), it cost $72,235 including destination, about $10,000 less than the AWD model. The Long Range trim omitted several features: ventilated seats, a rear-seat display, motorized tonneau cover, power outlets, and adaptive air suspension. MotorTrend noted that given the number of omitted features, further price reductions appeared unlikely, casting doubt on Tesla's ability to meet its original $39,900 target. The Long Range trim was discontinued in September 2025.

In February 2026, Tesla pushed the estimated delivery date for new orders of the dual-motor AWD to April 2027.

=== Discontinuation ===
On November 6, 2026, Tesla CEO Elon Musk announced on X that Cybertruck production will end in mid-2027 and that the existing factory space in Gigafactory Texas will be used for increased Cybercab production.

== Design ==
=== Inspiration and styling ===
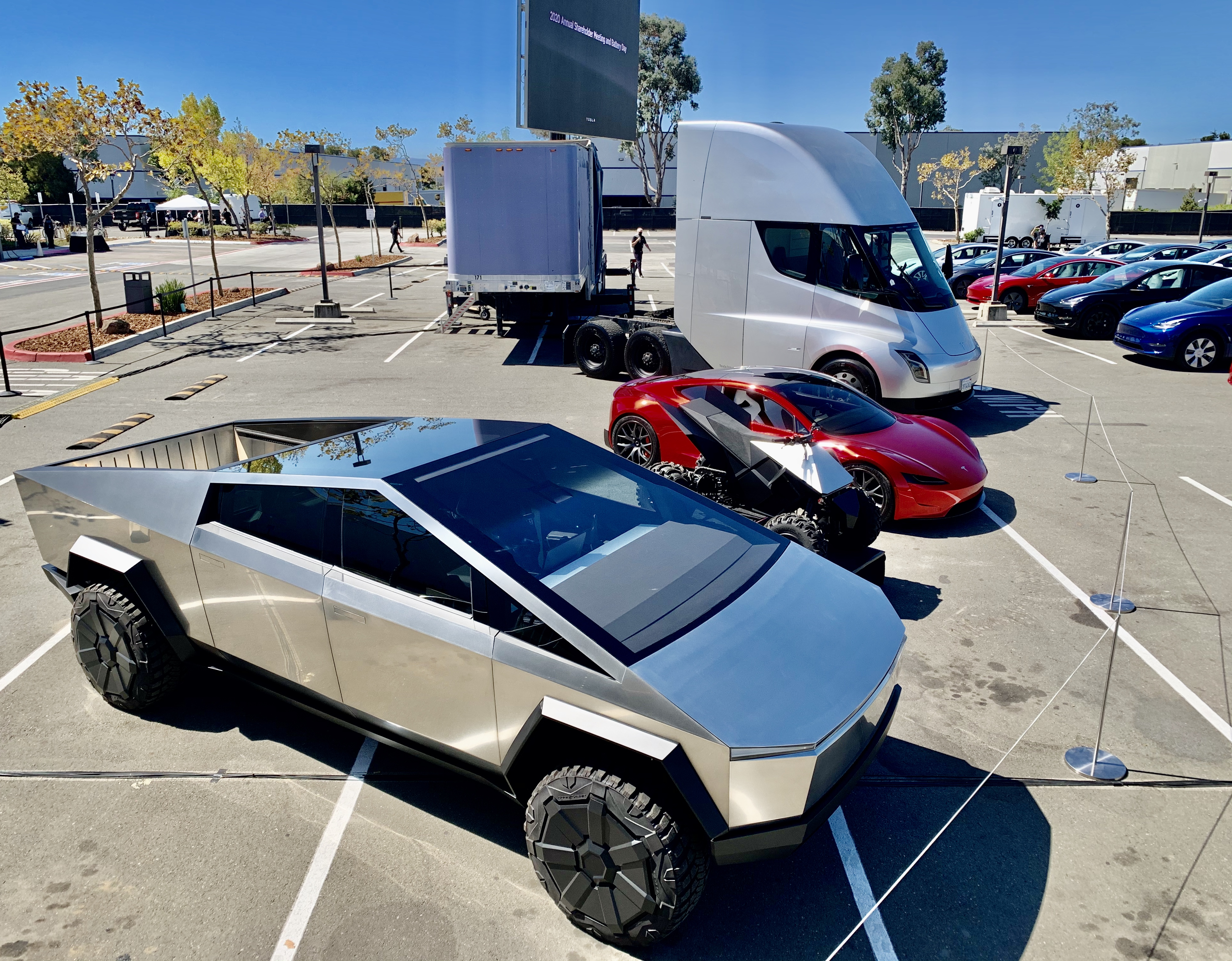
A lineup of preproduction Tesla vehicles, including the 2019 Cybertruck prototype, the Cyberquad, the second generation Roadster, and the Tesla Semi on display in September 2020

According to Musk, the design of the Cybertruck was inspired by Blade Runner and "Wet Nellie", the Lotus Esprit driven by James Bond in The Spy Who Loved Me, which doubled as a submarine.

In a Musk biography by Walter Isaacson, Musk's son Saxon was quoted as asking, "Why doesn't the future look like the future?", which Musk used as an inspiration for the design and repeated during the delivery event. Lars Moravy confirmed Musk's involvement: "Elon threw in that it had to drive like a sports car but have all the utility of a pick-up truck... basically, we were sweating bullets". Franz von Holzhausen stated the design process "started [by] unpacking existing pick-up trucks and realis[ing] that the market hasn't changed at all. [...] Like Gandini, we wanted to do something dramatic that changed everything. I had this simple idea right in the beginning: this exoskeleton idea, a low-resolution-looking type of truck. And out of that side project, we made a full-size clay model to show Elon. And he's like, 'that's what we're doing.'"

Automotive designer Frank Stephenson was critical of the Cybertruck, calling it "almost repulsive" but tempered his criticism by noting it "has the potential to be extremely beautiful" by softening the hard lines. Fellow designer Adrian Clarke was more unsparing: "The Cybertruck is a low polygon joke that only exists in the fever dreams of Tesla fans that stands high on the smell of Elon Musk's flatulences." Giorgetto Giugiaro, credited with originating the "origami" car design trend with the Lotus Esprit, BMW M1, and DeLorean, stated in 2023 that "when you step outside the norms, it's almost always seen as a provocation [...] the Cybertruck will surely be successful [...] I'm convinced it will find its admirers".

=== Exterior ===
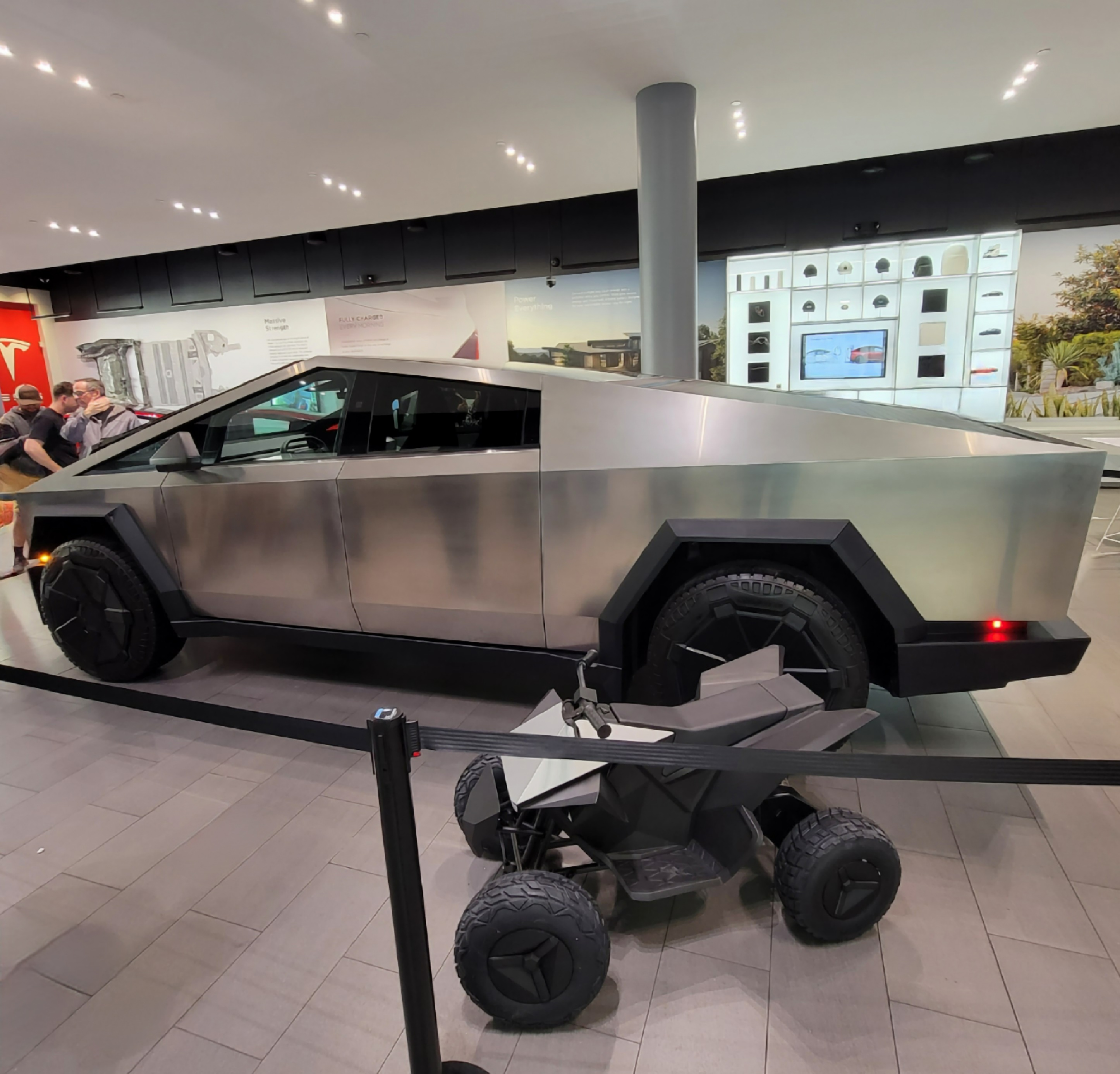
Production-spec Cybertruck and Cyberquad in a Tesla showroom (November 2023)

Tesla Cybertruck in Tokyo, Japan (2024)

The 300-series stainless-steel panels have a thickness of 0.071 and 0.055 in (1.8 and 1.4 mm) for the doors and body, respectively, according to a factory tour video. These panels cannot be stamped like conventional automobile parts, but instead are laser-cut and then bent along straight lines. According to Tesla's VP of Vehicle Engineering Lars Moravy, Tesla had to invent a manufacturing process called "air bending" which shapes the steel with high air pressure without actually touching the surface.

In 2019, Tesla said the Cybertruck would use the same 301 stainless steel that SpaceX planned for its Starship in partnership with Aperam.

=== Powertrain ===
All versions use liquid-cooled AC motors that drive the wheels through a single-speed fixed gear with an overall ratio of 15.02:1.

The single-motor RWD variant uses a permanent magnet motor mounted on the rear axle, . In the dual-motor AWD configuration, the same permanent magnet motor is used on the rear axle but is downrated to 297 hp (221 kW), paired with a front induction motor producing 303 hp (226 kW), resulting in a combined output of 600 hp (450 kW). The tri-motor AWD model reconfigures the layout by placing the permanent magnet motor on the front axle and incorporating two induction motors on the rear axle, delivering a peak combined output of 845 hp (630 kW) with 276 hp (206 kW) from the front motor and 284 hp (212 kW) from each rear motor.

Tesla had considered introducing a quad-motor version in late 2021.

Cybertruck trim specifications
Model Spec	Dual Motor All Wheel Drive	Premium All Wheel Drive	Cyberbeast
Motors	2 (front, rear)	2 (front, rear)	3 (front, two rear)
Range (EPA est.)*	314–340 miles (505–547 km)	314–340 miles (505–547 km)	301–320 miles (484–515 km)
0 to 60 mph (97 km/h)	4.1 sec.	4.1 sec.	2.6 sec. (Note: With rollout subtracted)
Top speed	112 mph (180 km/h)		130 mph (209 km/h)
Power	600 hp (447 kW)	600 hp (447 kW)	845 hp (630 kW)
Wheel torque	?	7,435 lb⋅ft (10,081 N⋅m)	10,296 lb⋅ft (13,960 N⋅m)
Suspension	Coil spring	Adaptive air suspension	
Payload capacity	2,006 lb (910 kg) (20-inch wheels)	2,200 lb (998 kg) (all season tires) 2,500 lb (1,134 kg) (all terrain tires)	2,000 lb (907 kg) (all season tires) 2,270 lb (1,030 kg) (all terrain tires)
Total Cargo Space	117.3 cubic feet (3.32 m^{3})	120 cubic feet (3.4 m^{3})	
Towing capacity	7,500 lb (3,402 kg)	11,000 lb (4,990 kg)	

*Quoted range estimates differ depending on year and options chosen, particularly wheel size, tire size, and tonneau covers

=== Suspension, chassis, and steering ===
Air-suspended versions offer up to 12 inches (30 cm) of suspension travel and up to 17.4 inches (44 cm) of ground clearance, with a 35° approach angle and 28° departure angle; the 2026 Dual Motor AWD trim uses coil springs with adaptive damping instead.

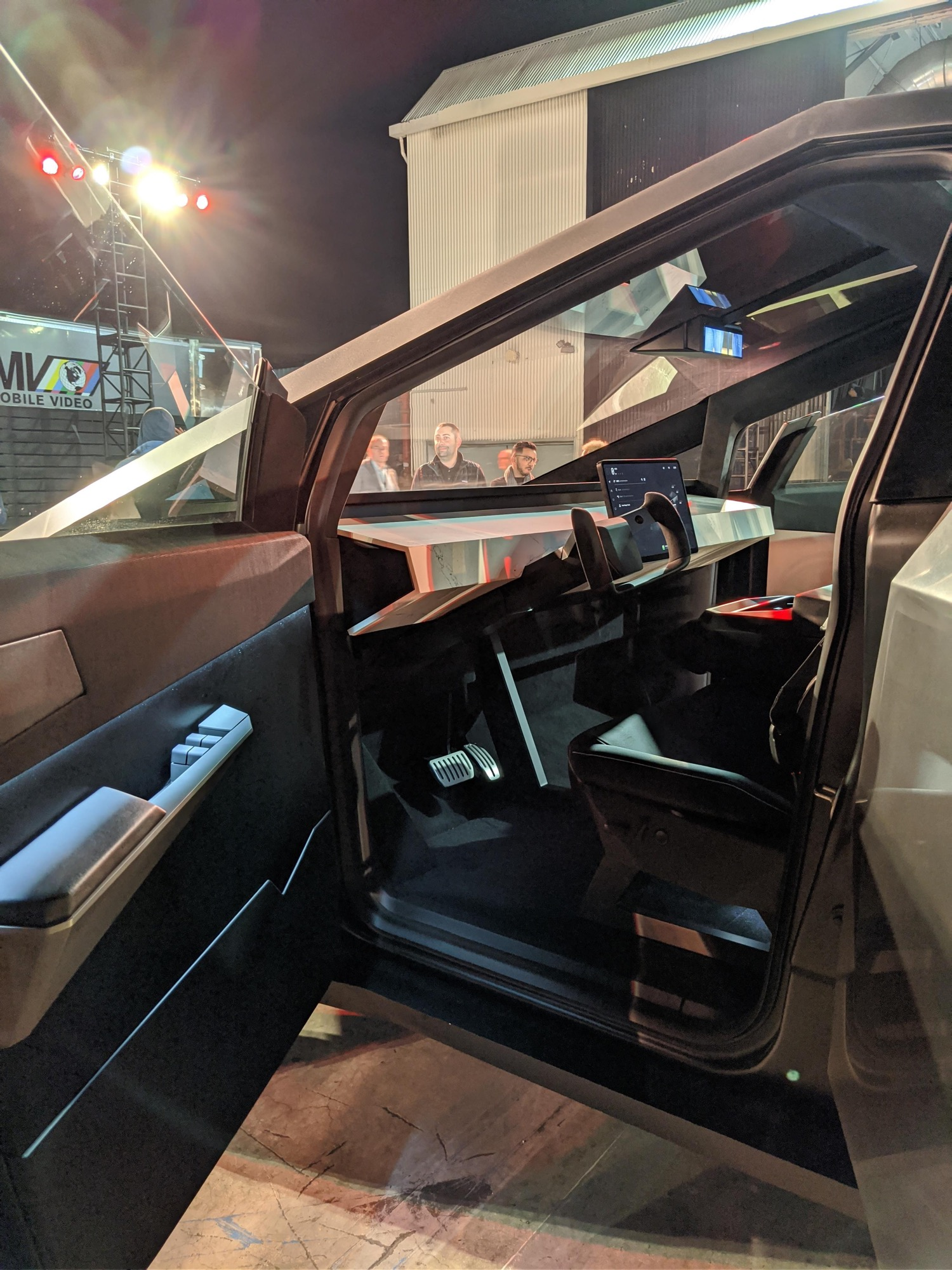
Interior view, 2019 prototype

The Cybertruck uses steer-by-wire, allowing all turns to be completed with less than a full rotation of the steering wheel, 340° lock-to-lock, 170° in each direction. Four-wheel steering, with the rear wheels able to move up to 10°, reduces the turning circle. The steering ratio is variable, the front axle has an electronically locking differential, and an off-road "Baja" mode lets the driver adjust the front–rear torque split.

=== Range, battery, and charging ===
Quoted range estimates for the Cybertruck differ by year and options chosen, particularly the wheel and tire size. The RWD "Long Range" configuration has a range of 331–362 miles (533–583 km), Tesla's 2023 estimates were up to 340 miles (547 km) for the AWD configuration and 320 miles (515 km) for the Cyberbeast.

The Cybertruck has an 816 V nominal, 150 Ah structural battery pack with a maximum capacity of 123 kWh. The pack serves as a structural member and is composed of 4680-format lithium-ion battery cells. With a stated energy density of 170 Wh/kg for the entire pack, the overall battery pack weight is 1,590 lb (720 kg). A "Wade Mode" raises the air suspension to its highest setting and uses the suspension compressor to pressurize the battery pack to keep water out; the on-screen notice gives a maximum depth of 31 inches (79 cm), and the mode switches off after 30 minutes.

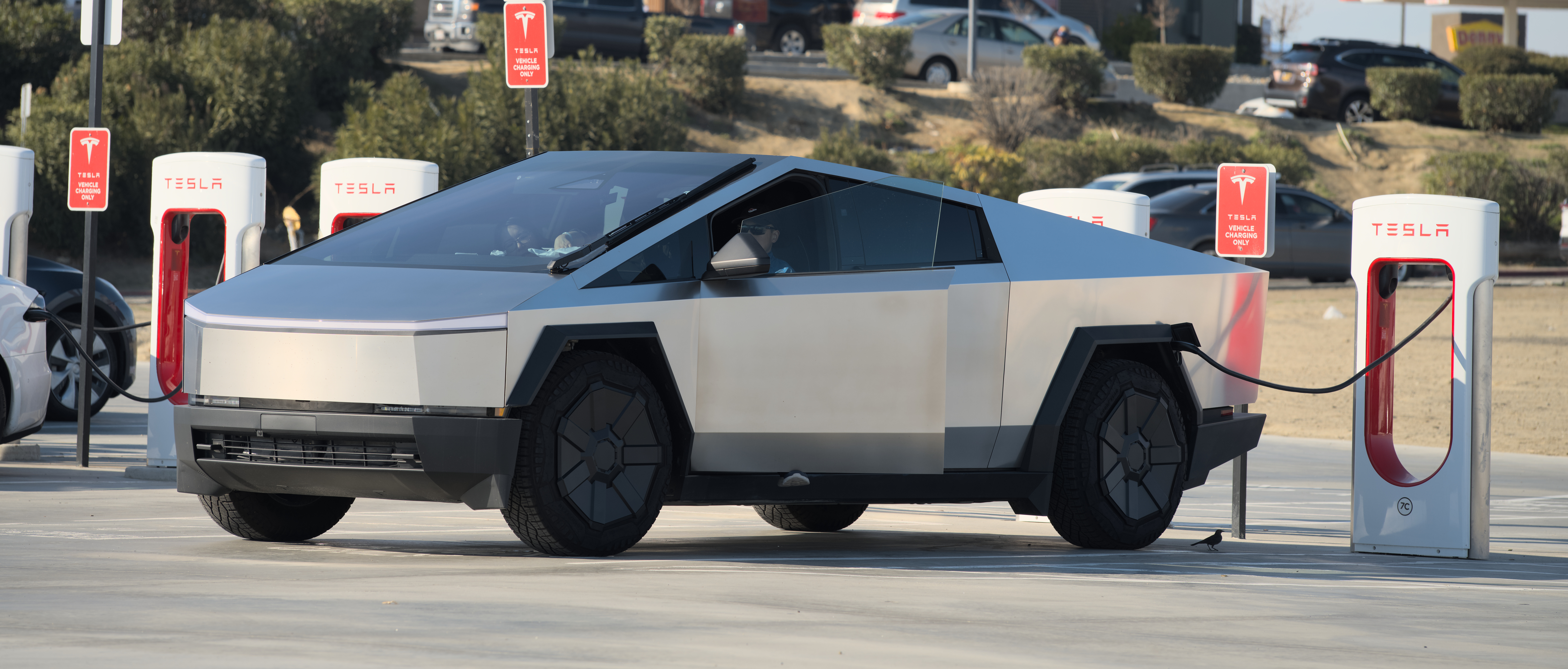
A Cybertruck charging at a V3 Supercharger

The battery is stated to charge at a maximum rate of 350 kW at charging stations capable of supplying 800 V DC power. Tesla states that up to 128 or 136 miles (206 or 219 km) (tri-motor or dual-motor versions, respectively) of range can be added in 15 minutes of charging at 400 V DC. The onboard charger can accept AC power at a maximum rate of 11.5 kW at 240 V, 48 A. The 800 V split-pack battery is composed of two 400 V batteries; contactors connect them in parallel for compatibility with widespread 400 V DC charging infrastructure.

==== Cancelled range extender ====
When the Cybertruck was unveiled in 2019, Tesla said versions would be offered with up to 500 miles (800 km) of range. However, the production model released only offered a range of 340 miles (550 km). To bridge the gap, Tesla announced a future optional "range extender": a 50 kWh battery pack that would be installed in the truck bed. Occupying about one-third of the cargo area, the module was expected to add 120 to 130 miles (190 to 210 km) of range.

At the launch of sales in 2023, Tesla began accepting a $2,000 deposit for the extender. However, by April 2025, the option was removed from Tesla's website, and in May, customers were notified by email that Tesla no longer planned to offer the range extender and that deposits would be refunded.

==== Vehicle-provided power ====
The dual-motor and tri-motor Cybertruck configurations provide up to 9.6 kW of continuous vehicle-to-load (V2L) AC power through five integrated outlets:

- Four 120 V, 20 A outlets (NEMA 5-20): two located in the cabin and two in the bed
- One 240 V, 40 A outlet (NEMA 14-50): located in the bed

Both the AWD and Cyberbeast variants support up to 11.5 kW of vehicle-to-home (V2H) AC output. Enabling bidirectional energy transfer to a home requires a Tesla Wall Connector and either a Tesla Gateway or Powerwall system.

=== Mid-voltage electrical system ===
The Cybertruck uses a 48-volt electrical system; this 48 V DC is fed to electric-powered components including power-steering motors, window lift motors, radiator fans, HVAC blowers, accessory power feed to the frunk (400 W) and to the tonneau roof (400 W), three domain controller ECUs, the touchscreen and a 48-volt lithium-ion battery.

=== Interior ===
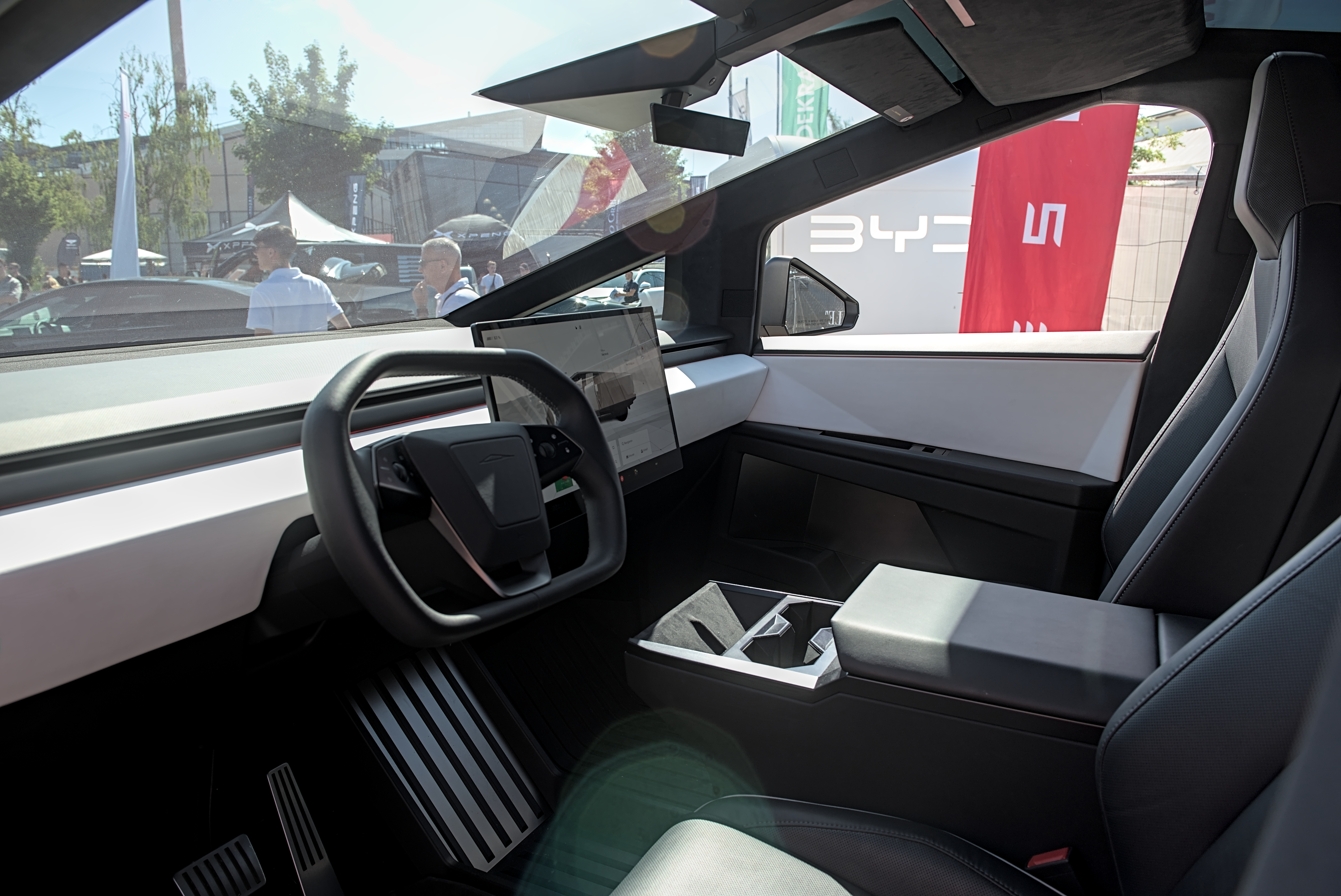
Interior

The Cybertruck has five seats, two in the front and a three-seat bench in the back row. The vehicle has an 18.5 in (47 cm) touch-screen display in the front for most of the climate, media, and vehicle controls. AWD and Cyberbeast configurations also have a 9.4 in (24 cm) touch-screen for the rear seat passengers. The steering wheel is in the shape of a "squircle," with a flat top and bottom, and round sides.

=== Cargo bed ===
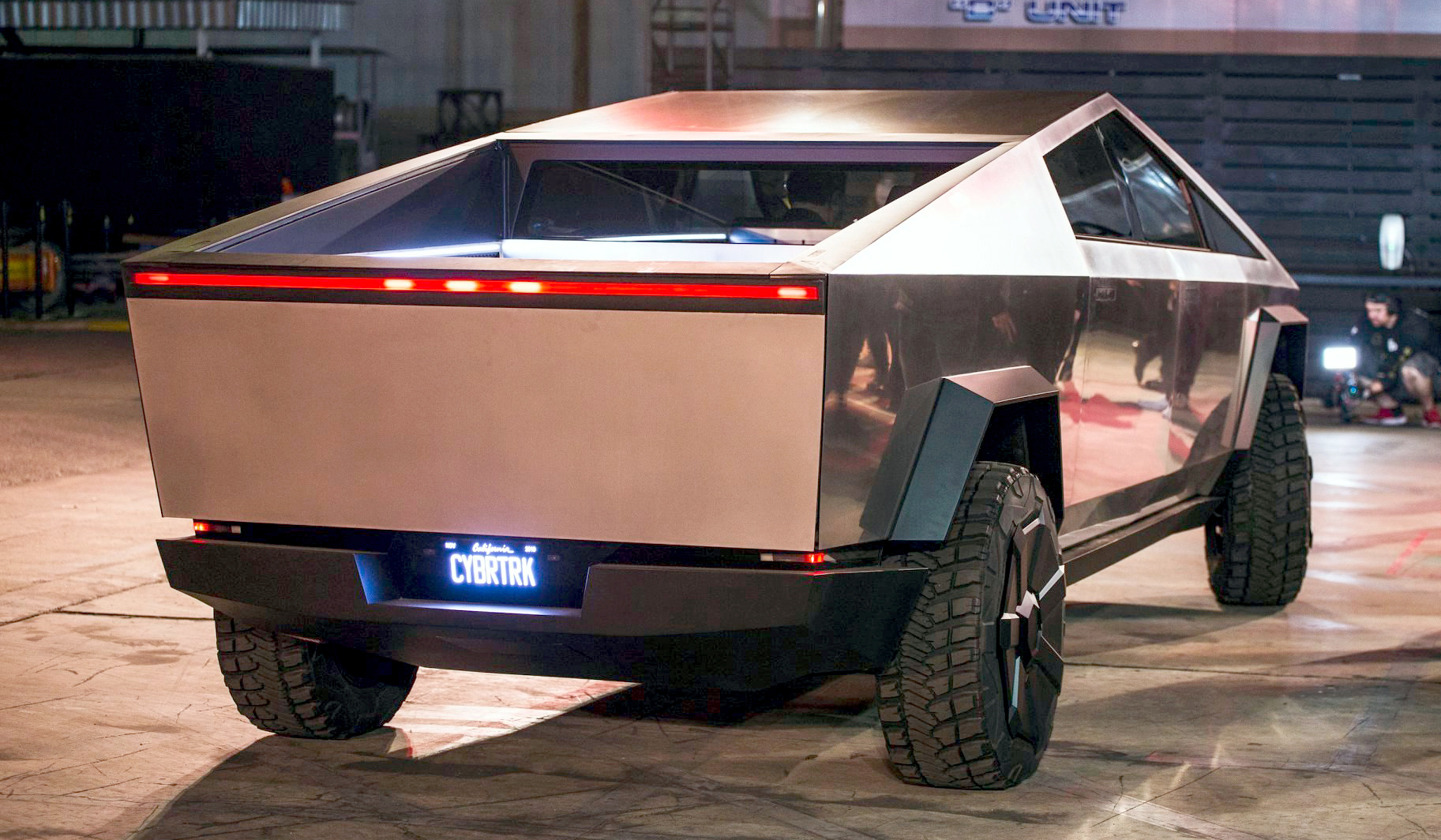
Rear view, 2019 prototype

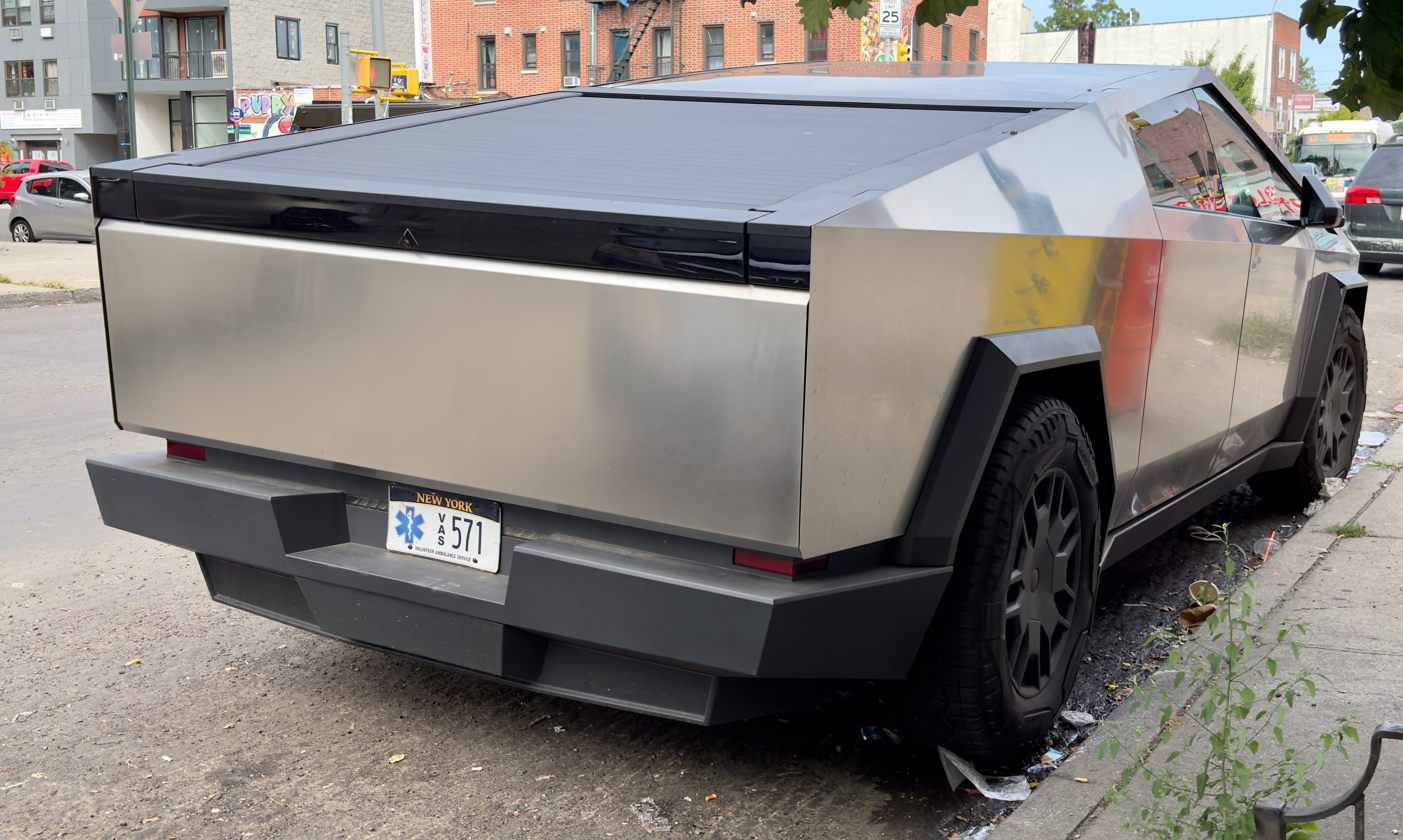
Rear view, Foundation Series

The Cybertruck's cargo bed measures 6 feet (1.8 m) long and 4 feet (1.2 m) wide, with 67 ft^{3} (1.9 m^{3}) of lockable storage. The dual-motor and tri-motor configurations include a motorized roller shutter-style hard tonneau cover that retracts behind the bed's front bulkhead.

When the tonneau cover is closed, the rear window is blocked. To aid visibility when reversing and towing, the feed from rear-facing cameras is displayed on the main touchscreen.

In the dual-motor and tri-motor configurations, the bed area includes additional features such as LED light strips along the side walls, a secondary storage compartment located below the main bed floor behind the rear wheels, and integrated 120 V and 240 V AC outlets.

=== Network ===
The Cybertruck uses a gigabit Ethernet loop, which Tesla calls "Etherloop", to connect its high-speed controllers. According to Tesla engineer Pete Bannon, this lets the truck use 155 wires compared with 490 in the Tesla Model 3, a 68% reduction, even though it has 368 endpoints against the Model 3's 273; high-power harness mass fell by 84%.

== Reception ==
The Cybertruck has been criticized for its poor build quality, malfunctions, safety problems, and price hikes following reservations. Conversely, in 2024, Car and Driver magazine gave the Cybertruck a score of 8.5 out of 10, saying that "The buzz-worthy Cybertruck leads with show-pony party tricks and high-tech features, but it's also a capable workhorse with a practical side." CleanTechnica also gave Cybertruck a positive review, calling it "an engineering and technical marvel, a joy to drive". Motor Trend shortlisted it for the magazine's 2025 Truck of the Year, praising its steer-by-wire system and other tech, but criticizing "the design's many compromises". The Cybertruck's design has been described as "post-apocalyptic" and "dystopian", and its marketing as a reflection of perceived societal decay within America. The vehicle's many detractors have given it derogatory names and have associated it with the politics of Elon Musk.

The Cybertruck's stainless steel finish was found to be prone to surface contamination and surface rust, which requires special care, such as drying after rain and avoiding washing the vehicle in direct sunlight.

=== Sales ===
As of June 2024, a total of 11,688 Tesla Cybertrucks had been sold, and it outsold the Ford F-150 Lightning in the second quarter of 2024, though the Lightning remained ahead for the year to date. By October 2024, industry estimates placed cumulative sales at approximately 27,185. In October 2024, Tesla dropped the Foundation Series premium, cutting the AWD model's starting price to $79,990. According to Cox Automotive, total sales for 2024 were estimated at 38,965, making it the best-selling electric pickup truck in the United States. A recall stated that 46,096 vehicles had been produced prior to February 27, 2025.

In Q1 2025, sales of the Cybertruck fell significantly compared to the two previous quarters, and it lost the title of the best-selling electric pickup truck in the United States to the Ford F-150 Lightning. Just over 16,000 vehicles were sold in the first three quarters of 2025. In August 2025, Tesla started selling the Cybertruck in South Korea. In October 2025, Tesla started selling the Cybertruck in the United Arab Emirates, Qatar, and Saudi Arabia.

Initially seen as a market success, the Cybertruck generated significant hype, but this enthusiasm quickly faded, leading some industry commentators to describe its commercial performance as disappointing and certain analysts labeling it an "undisputable commercial failure". In April 2025, Forbes labeled the Cybertruck as the worst automobile industry "flop" in decades, selling at only 10% of production capacity.

Bloomberg later compared the vehicle in terms of its sales and rejection by mass car consumers to the Ford's short-lived Edsel division, stating the Cybertruck "may well be on its way" to becoming the new "greatest automotive flop of all time".

In October 2026, Tesla canceled plans to sell the Cybertruck in Australia and New Zealand, seven years after accepting reservations with deposits for the vehicle in those countries.

=== Insurance rates ===
In August 2025, the website Futurism said that some insurance policies for Cybertrucks in North America would cost about $1,000 more per year than the national average. Hanover Insurance terminated existing Cybertruck policies in 2025 citing low production volume and high repair costs.

== Safety concerns ==
By December 2024, about a year after its release, the Cybertruck had been the subject of 26 complaints and seven recalls, according to the National Highway Traffic Safety Administration (NHTSA).

The Cybertruck's angular design and stiff stainless-steel exterior raised concerns among safety experts that it could hurt pedestrians and cyclists and damage other vehicles on roads. One expert raised concerns about limited crumple zones, though he added that other features might make up for that. The head of ANCAP said the truck's frontal rake looked "not very forgiving in terms of legs" in a collision with a pedestrian. As of 2025, the Cybertruck is not allowed on roads in the United Kingdom due to safety concerns, and does not meet European Union pedestrian safety standards as a type, although registrations may be individually accepted. Tesla defended the design, saying that the structures of the Cybertruck would absorb an impact during a crash, and pointing out that it passed a U.S. regulatory review, although they also admitted that it would be very hard to meet European Union pedestrian safety laws.

After a fatal crash in Piedmont, California, a witness could not open the Cybertruck's doors to rescue the occupants and had to break a window with a tree branch. An engineer noted that the truck's manual door releases are in "obscure locations". In August 2024, Michael Sheehan died when his Cybertruck hit a culvert, flipped and caught fire in Baytown, Texas; he had been drinking. A lawsuit by his family alleges that the battery went into thermal runaway and that the fire reached 5,000 °F (2,800 °C).

In 2025, Cybertrucks built after April 2025 were crash-tested by the US Insurance Institute for Highway Safety (IIHS), and received a "good" rating crashworthiness, indicating that the car provides "excellent protection for the driver and solid protection for rear passengers", but receiving "acceptable" and "marginal" ratings for other aspects.

=== Other concerns ===
Elon Musk said in 2022 that the Cybertruck would be "waterproof enough to serve briefly as a boat" and could "cross rivers, lakes & even seas that aren't too choppy", but multiple incidents have been reported of Cybertrucks getting stuck in water, including one that was fully submerged at Ventura Harbor, California, in March 2025.

== See also ==
- Retrofuturism
