= Tesla Powershare =

Tesla vehicle technology

Tesla Powershare is a bi-directional charging technology with the ability to supply power to external items from a Tesla vehicle, such as electrical tools and appliances, another Tesla or non-Tesla vehicle, or a home. As of December 2023, Powershare is available only via Tesla Cybertruck. Similar features are available from automakers such as Ford, General Motors, and Kia.

== Cybertruck ==
For vehicle to load (V2L) use and vehicle to vehicle (V2V) charging, Cybertruck offers five power outlets :

- 2× 120 V 20 A (2.4 kW each) NEMA 5-20 in the cabin (1 inside center console, 1 at rear console),
- 2× 120 V 20 A (2.4 kW each) NEMA 5-20 in cargo bed,
- 1× 240 V 40 A (9.6 kW) NEMA 14-50 in cargo bed.

For bidirectional charging scenarios (V2H/V2G), it offers more power on its NACS charging inlet (now also used as an outlet) via an internal bidirectional AC charger (240V, 48A, 11.52 kW).

Cybertruck comes with a 123 kwh or larger battery, which Tesla claimed should be sufficient to power a typical US house for about three days, given that the Cybertruck battery pack's capacity is the equivalent of roughly 10× Gen2/Gen3 Tesla Powerwalls.

== Specifications ==
For home backup, Powershare delivers a maximum 11.5 kW continuous power at 240 V AC. LRA motor start is 110 Amps. Its power outlets can deliver 9.6 kW in total to other loads.

== Requirements ==
Vehicle to AC loads (V2L): Devices such as power tools can be directly connected to the outlets in the truck.

Vehicle to Vehicle (V2V) AC charging: Charging another vehicle requires a Tesla Mobile Connector. The vehicle to be charged needs a matching AC charging inlet, so eventually an SAE J1772 charging adapter between the plug of the Tesla Mobile Connector and the (AC) charging inlet of the other vehicle.

Vehicle to Home (V2H) via AC: Connecting a Tesla Powershare compatible vehicle to a home requires one of two setups: either a Tesla Powerwall and Tesla Wall Connector. Alternatively, a Tesla Universal Wall Connector and Tesla Gateway, and optionally a Tesla Backup Switch can be used. With the Tesla Backup Switch, faster, more affordable installations are possible when approved by utility and jurisdiction. The Tesla Wall Connector (without Universal in its name) alone is not marked as compatible with Tesla Powershare on the Tesla website, in contrast to the Tesla Universal Wall Connector, which is stated as compatible.
