= Federated Group =

Former American consumer electronics retailer

- Type: Subsidiary
- Industry: Retail
- Founded: 1970; 56 years ago in Los Angeles, California, U.S.
- Founder: Wilfred Schwartz
- Defunct: 1989; 37 years ago
- Fate: Acquired by Silo
- Headquarters: Sunnyvale, California, U.S.
- Area served: Arizona, California, Kansas, and Texas
- Key people: Wilfred Schwartz (Chairman); Shadoe Stevens (Spokesperson); Jack Tramiel (former President and CEO, Atari Corporation)
- Products: Consumer electronics
- Parent: Atari Corporation (1987–1989)

Federated Group was an American chain of consumer electronics retail stores with 67 stores in California, Texas, Arizona, and Kansas. The company was founded by Wilfred Schwartz in 1970, and opened the first deep discount consumer electronics "superstore" in the United States. In 1987, Federated Group was the fourth-largest discounter of consumer electronics in the U.S. The company's headquarters were in City of Commerce, California and later in Sunnyvale, California. Federated Group was sold to Atari in 1987, and sold again to Silo in 1989.

== History ==
Federated Group was started by Wilfred Schwartz in 1970 when he bought a 25,000-square-foot warehouse in Los Angeles from an electronics company and turned part of it into a retail store. In 1976, Federated Group closed two stores and built a 20,000-square-foot "superstore" in Westminster, California - the label superstore referring to their large size, leaving the company with 3 stores located in Hollywood, West LA, and Westminster. At least 8 stores were added in the ensuing years before 1982.

The company expanded quickly in 1984 after going from a private company to publicly traded, and launched a major expansion into Texas, with 25 stores operating by December 1984. The timing of the expansion into Texas hurt Federated Group since the state was experiencing an economic slowdown from the oil bust. In Federated Group's home territory of Los Angeles, the competition was increasing due to the entrance of Circuit City into the market in 1985, by which time 40 stores were operating in Arizona, Texas, and California.

== Advertising ==
Federated is remembered for its advertising. Shadoe Stevens began playing the "Fred R. Rated" character for Federated Group in 1982 and eventually appeared in more than 1,000 commercials. The commercials were similar to east coast chain Crazy Eddie.The offbeat style of the commercials, and Federated's expansion, contributed to a profit of 10.3 million in 1986. One commercial had Stevens tell viewers that rabid frogs had eaten the company's warehouse and they were passing the savings on to the customers. Sales went up by 30 percent after that spot and Federated Group nominated itself for Adweek magazine's annual "Bad Advertising" issue.

Chairman Schwartz described the advertising this way during a 1984 Morgan Stanley seminar:

Our company has become very well known because we use a very tongue-in-cheek, humorous television campaign featuring the antics of two very zany characters called "Fred" and "Freda Rated", whose skits have earned the reputation of being more entertaining and exciting than the programming which surrounds them.

By 1987 the company had expanded to 67 stores, but was losing some of the Southern California market to Circuit City. Federated Group began to tone down much of its Fred Rated advertising and began looking for a new image. Federated commercials had inspired imitators.

== Sale to Atari ==
Federated Group began to lose money in August 1987, so Schwartz decided to sell the company to Atari for US$67.3 million. Atari purchased Federated Group to gain retail shelf space since many retailers had shunned the company's products after being hurt by the collapse of Atari's video game business. The deal made sense for Atari since Federated Group could provide their expertise to sell more computers. In 1988, Atari filed a lawsuit claiming that it was defrauded of US$43 million when it bought Federated Group. The lawsuit charged that Wilfred Schwartz and other Federated Group officers conspired to misrepresent the value of the company's assets.

In November 1989, Atari agreed to sell 26 Federated Group stores in Los Angeles and San Diego to Silo after announcing a loss of nearly US$85 million earlier that year. The remaining stores began liquidation sales in December 1989 and were closed four to five months later.

== Sale to Silo ==
Silo opened stores in San Diego in 1976 and had been looking for an opportunity to expand into the Los Angeles market. Federated Group's 21 stores in Los Angeles and Orange counties and five stores in San Diego were reopened under the Silo name in 1990.

In January 1994, Silo closed nine former Federated Group stores in Los Angeles, the same year that Best Buy later entered the market. Silo filed for bankruptcy in December 1995 and closed all of its stores.
