= Universal Stainless =

American producer of specialty steel products

Universal Stainless and Alloy Products, Inc.
- Company type: Subsidiary
- Industry: Steel
- Founded: 1992; 34 years ago
- Headquarters: Bridgeville, Pennsylvania, USA
- Parent: Aperam
- Website: www.univstainless.com

Universal Stainless and Alloy Products, Inc. is a specialty steel products producer. Headquartered in Bridgeville, Pennsylvania, it has been owned by Aperam since January 2025.

== History ==
In 1992, a group of former managers of Cyclops Steel formed a new company, Universal Stainless & Alloy, and bought out the former Cyclops Steel mills in Bridgeville and Titusville in 1994.

In 2002 Universal Stainless took control of a major steel mill in Dunkirk, New York, following its closure the previous year.

In 2019 Universal Stainless invested $10 million in their subsidiary Dunkirk Specialty Steel LLC's Dunkirk, New York plant. The investment received support from city, county, and state development authorities.

In 2021 an accident at Universal Stainless's Collier Township facility resulted in a significant explosion and one injury.

In 2022 Universal Stainless expanded its North Jackson, Ohio facility adding an additional steel melting furnace. 2022 was a difficult year for the company with it taking an overall loss of $8 million. Sales and margins improved significantly in 2023 over 2022 driven by growth in the aerospace sector.

In October 2024 Universal Stainless agreed to be acquired by European steel company Aperam for $45 a share. Later in October 2024 it was revealed that the Air Force had identified defective parts made with steel from Universal Stainless as the cause of a number of accidents and incidents involving the V-22 Osprey. The story was first reported by Hunterbrook and was corroborated by Military.com and Air Current. In November 2024 the family of one of the airmen who died in the Opsrey crashes sued the aircraft's makers Bell Textron and Boeing along with Universal Stainless.

Aperam completed the acquisition of Universal Stainless in January 2025. In March 2025 a worker died in an accident at the Dunkirk mill.

== Leadership ==
As of 2023 Universal Stainless's chief executive officer (CEO) was Dennis M. Oates.

== See also ==
- Alleghany Corporation
