= Silo (store) =

Electronics retailer

- Industry: Retail
- Founded: 1946; 80 years ago
- Defunct: 1995; 31 years ago
- Fate: Bought out by Fretter; liquidated
- Products: Electronics

Silo was an electronics retailer operated throughout the United States between 1947 and 1995. The western region stores were known for a number of years as "Downings" in Colorado and "Appliance-TV City" in Arizona and California.

== History ==
=== Beginning ===
Silo was founded by Sidney Cooper in Philadelphia, Pennsylvania, in 1946 following his service in World War II. The company was named for himself and for his wife Lorraine, combining the first two letters of each name. Prior to opening its first retail store, Silo operated as a door-to-door installment business. With the advent of television, Cooper saw an opportunity and seized it. He opened his first store about 1951 in the Manayunk section of Philadelphia, featuring appliances and televisions. Silo was an early discounter, operating under the name "Silo Discount Centers." Silo regularly opened on Sundays, violating Pennsylvania's strict Blue laws. Cooper claimed that it was necessary to open on Sunday in order to serve working families, and was even arrested at least once for doing so. On one such occasion, the press was on hand to cover the arrest, apparently tipped off by Cooper himself, who understood the value of free publicity. The company grew rapidly, opening stores throughout the tri-state region over the next twenty years. Silo went public in 1962, raising money to fuel its geographic expansion throughout a region bounded by Trenton, New Jersey, Wilmington, Delaware, and Reading, Pennsylvania. The company's early advertising stressed that the "S" in Silo stood for savings, service, selection and satisfaction. Early store formats of 4,000 to 8,000 square feet were considered large by standards of the day. Later, Silo operated stores of 12,000 to 25,000 square feet, with two warehouse outlets of almost 60,000 square feet in Buffalo, New York and New Orleans, Louisiana. Stores were generally freestanding, with some attached to shopping centers or malls.

=== Expansion ===
In 1970 Silo made its first foray beyond the Philadelphia metro area, purchasing a number of Downing's stores from Sam Bloom in Denver, Colorado. Shortly after, Silo purchased three Appliance-TV City stores in Arizona from its founder, Jay Winslow. The Colorado and Arizona acquisitions enjoyed rapid expansion, as Silo applied its formula of low pricing, huge selection, and aggressive advertising. The 1970s Silo television jingle, "Silo is having a sale," was so pervasive that many Philadelphians today can still hum the jingle and would not believe that it has not aired in decades. Another of Silo's aggressive price promotions was a 1986 advertisement offering a stereo system for "299 bananas." Customers in Seattle and El Paso took the offer literally and came to the stores with real bananas. Silo honored the offer, trading 32 stereos in Seattle and three in El Paso for bananas; the stores lost $10,465 on these transactions.

In 1972 Silo launched Audio World, a wholly owned subsidiary which sold stereo systems and audio components. Initially a few freestanding stores in the greater Philadelphia area, by 1974 Audio World departments were being incorporated into all existing and new Silo stores when the concept proved successful. The audio expansion came at the expense of small appliances whose profit margins had disappeared for Silo, which thereafter concentrated on retailing only large appliances along with the new audio and TV sections, and was branded as Silo/Audio World for a number of years.

In 1976 Cooper died at the age of 57 and leadership of the business passed to his son-in-law Barry Feinberg, an attorney. At the time of Cooper's death, Silo operated 40 stores with revenues of $60 million. Feinberg expanded an already aggressive advertising campaign and eschewed Cooper's approach of geographic expansion by acquisition. Feinberg believed that Silo could stand on its own in new markets, without purchasing "recognition," and his approach was successful for a number of years.

Silo was acquired by Cyclops Steel, a Pittsburgh-based specialty steelmaker in February 1980. Cyclops had decided to diversify outside of the steel business and had already made one retail acquisition, the Busy Beaver home store chain in Pittsburgh, Pennsylvania. Cyclops was willing to bet aggressively on Feinberg's strategy of attacking new markets with multiple simultaneous store openings accompanied by a massive advertising blitz - all under the Silo brand. Silo expanded rapidly and coast-to-coast over the next several years.

Silo purchased 19 stores in the Los Angeles area from the Federated Group in 1989. Prior to opening its first store, the company launched a highly visible but deliberately ambiguous "teaser" ad campaign, "The Silos are coming", arousing much curiosity, and even fear of the upcoming date. The campaign, created by Saatchi & Saatchi Creative Director Jay Montgomery, featured quasi man-on-the-street speculation about the "19 Silo sites proposed for the Southland". The campaign generated over 10,000 phone calls the first week. Callers were sent coupons and a t-shirt reading, "I feel better with a Silo nearby". The effort was so successful, Silo had to increase its sales projections twice during the soft opening. Feinberg personally called about 180 people who were legitimately upset by the ruse. Along with his apology, a $500 gift certificate was sent to each.

Cyclops ultimately sold the retailer to Dixons Group PLC, a Great Britain-based firm, in 1987. Cyclops investment was quite successful, returning more than ten times its original investment in just seven years. At its peak, Silo operated 232 stores throughout the United States, with revenues of $1.2 billion. Dixons struggled to adapt is European style to the US markets. While competitors were opening much larger superstores, Dixons was comfortable with the far smaller footprint of its urban retail outlets in the UK, often as small as 2,000 square feet. Dixons failed to make the needed adjustments; ultimately, Feinberg and Dixon's had a falling out over this and other policies, and Feinberg left.

=== Fretter Buyout and Final Years ===
In 1993, Dixons decided to throw in the towel on its investment, and sold a controlling stake in Silo for $45 million (~$88 million in 2024) to Fretter, Inc. Fretter was a Detroit, Michigan-based company, operating electronics stores under the Fretter's, YES! (short for Your Electronics Store), Dash Concepts, and Fred Schmid banners. At the time of the purchase, Silo featured 183 stores that were, due to stiff competition from such retailers as Circuit City and Best Buy, facing dwindling sales. The Fretter stores were facing similar competition, and Fretter management hoped that the combination would create a retail electronics powerhouse better suited to take on the up-and-coming companies.

By the time of the Fretter acquisition, Silo was damaged goods. Fretter was faced with integrating a chain with both dwindling market share and outdated and aging inventory. One way Fretter dealt with this challenge was to convert several of the Silo stores into outlet-based units to sell off the excess inventory.

Fretter also attempted to bill its stores as superstores, with a marketing strategy similar to that of Circuit City and Best Buy. However, the smaller size of its Silo and Fretter's units (10,000 to 15,000 square feet, as opposed to 35,000 square feet or more for a typical Circuit City store), made this an untenable strategy. According to one analyst, "Fretter was vanilla. You have to stand for something. They were so price-conscious that they never even thought about a personality. That's what our arguments with them were always about: You have to stand for something in the consumer's mind. You can't just live on price alone, or you'll go out of business."

Declining market shares, lingering debt from the acquisition, and an outdated store format eventually doomed Fretter to failure. The company began to exit its markets, quickly and quietly, and customers and employees would sometimes find the stores suddenly closed during normal business hours. Silo's seven Pittsburgh-area stores, for example, were precipitously closed when employees received word that they were to pack all remaining inventory and close the store that day. Employees that remained silent during closing were promised a generous severance. Scott White, a former store manager, reportedly went to the press with the information. This resulted in a mob of customers flocking to the Pittsburgh stores to demand goods left on lay-a-way, or a return of their deposits. Silo reopened their doors for three days to accommodate these customers.

By the end of 1995, Fretter closed all remaining Silo stores and placed the parent company into bankruptcy. The remainder of the company's stores were closed by May 1996.
