= Tesla Cyberquad =

Electric quad bike all-terrain vehicle

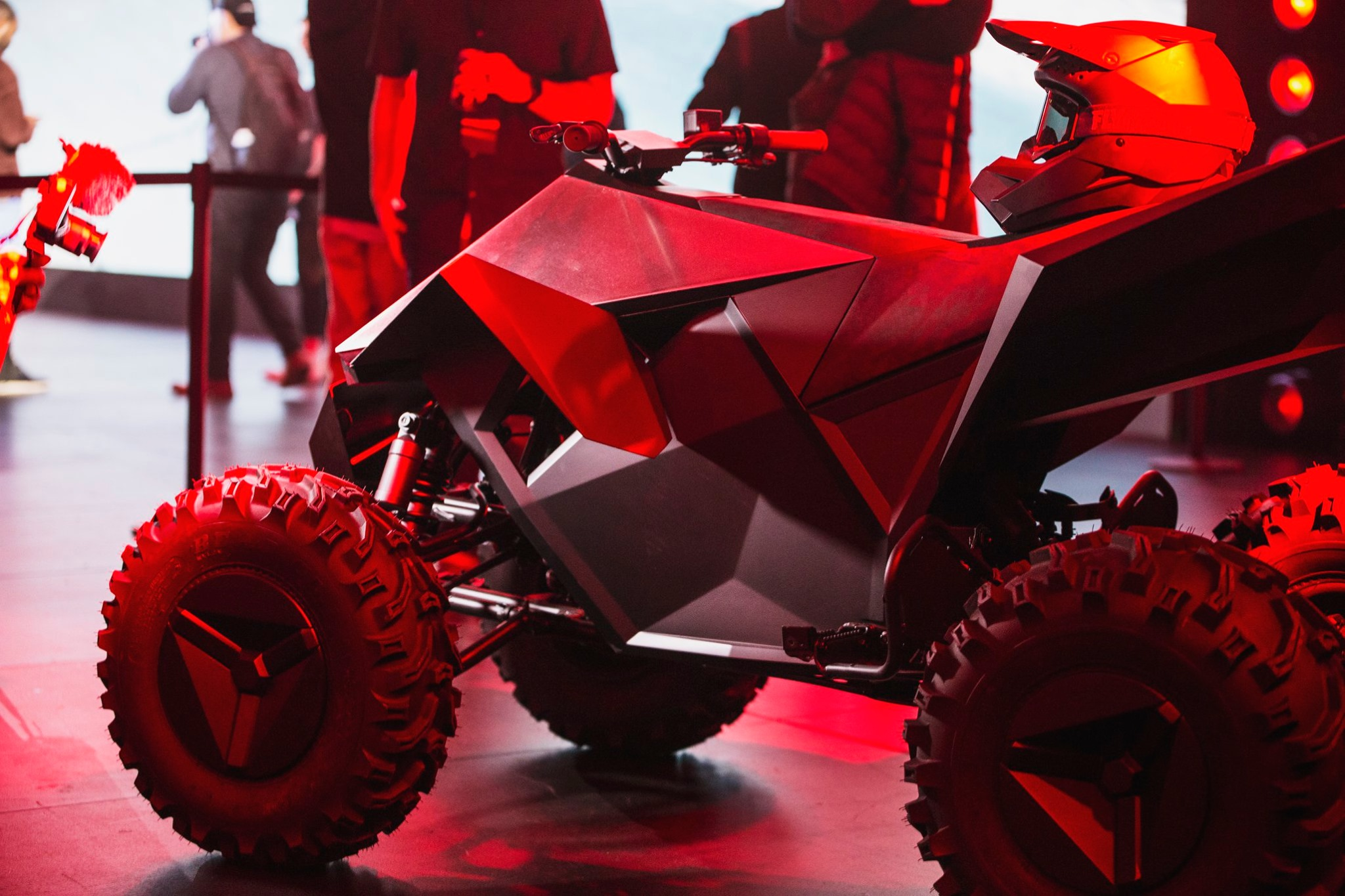
- A Cyberquad on display at the unveiling event

Overview
- Manufacturer: Tesla, Inc.
- Also called: Tesla ATV

Body and chassis
- Class: All-terrain vehicle

The Tesla Cyberquad is an unreleased electric all-terrain vehicle (ATV) concept presented by Tesla, Inc., at the Tesla Cybertruck's November 2019 unveiling. Concluding the presentation at the company's design studio in Hawthorne, California, CEO Elon Musk announced "one more thing", at which point the ATV was shown being loaded onto the back of the Cybertruck. Observers have pointed to elements seen at the unveiling indicating that the Cyberquad prototype had been built by swapping the powerplant and plastics on a Yamaha Raptor. Certain images from the rear suggest the vehicle also appears to have a powertrain borrowed from Zero Motorcycles.

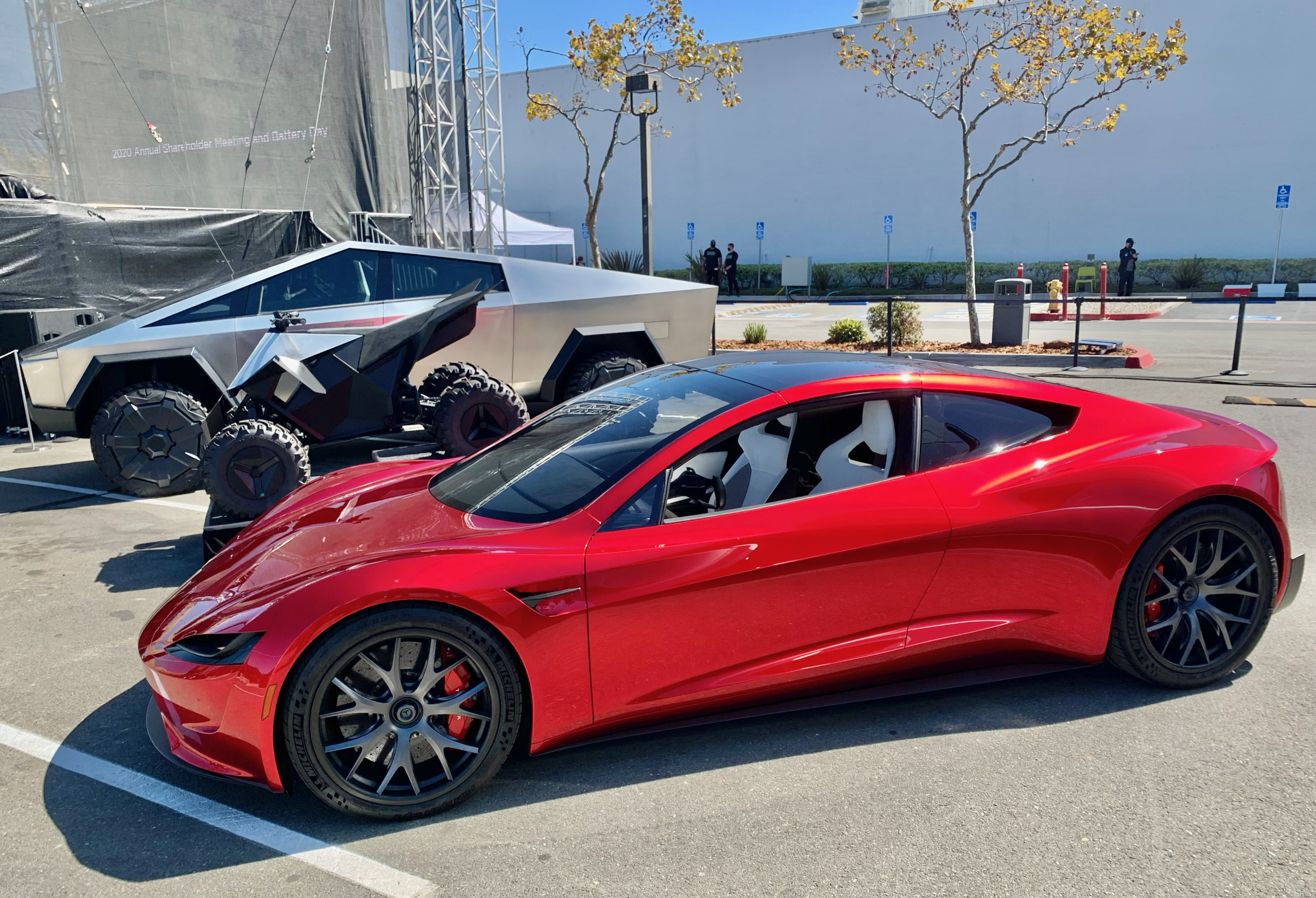
Tesla Cyberquad prototype between the Cybertruck and Roadster during a Tesla event in 2020

The ATV was mentioned in the specifications for the Cybertruck; the Cybertruck was described as having "space for your toolbox, tire and Cyberquad, with room to spare". One day later, Musk tweeted, "Tesla 2 person electric ATV will come at first as an option for Cybertruck." The ATV can charge in the bed of the Tesla Cybertruck from its 120 or 240 volt charging system. Pricing was not mentioned.

The trademark "Cyberquad" was registered in November 2019. During Tesla's 2020 Battery Day Event, Musk brought a prototype of the Cyberquad for investors. He announced that the Cyberquad would be available as an optional accessory for the Cybertruck in late 2021. Musk mentioned the Cyberquad again at the 2021 shareholder meeting in October, but he provided no further details on the production start.

== Charging ==
The ATV can charge in the bed of the Tesla Cybertruck from its 120 or 240 volt charging system.

== Cyberquad for Kids ==
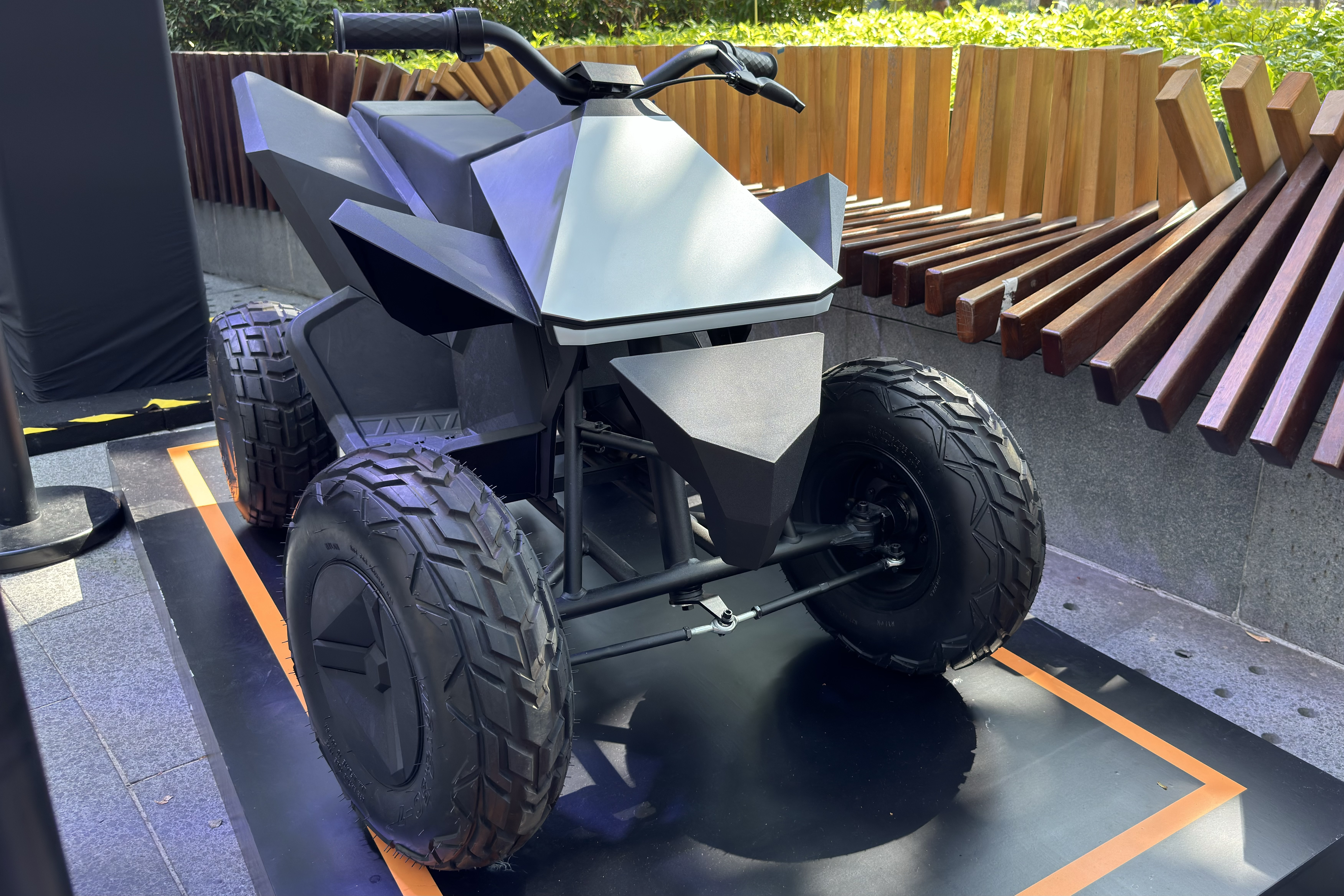
A Cyberquad for Kids in China

During Cyber week at the start of December 2021 Tesla released a scaled-down Cyberquad for Kids (Model 914) mini-ATV designed for children. The smaller ATV was announced as limited to a top speed of 10 miles per hour (16 km/h), with a passenger weight limit of 150 pounds (68 kg), and a price of $1,900. Product purchase was only available to those with an existing Tesla purchase or reservation and initial production sold out on the first day, before being opened up again. Cyberquad for Kids was the third Tesla product produced by Radio Flyer for Tesla. The battery operates at 36 volts, with 0.288 kilowatt-hours (288 Wh) of electrical capacity giving a range of up to 15 miles (24 km) or approximately one hour of use per charge. There are two speed settings, one for 5 mph (8 km/h) and one for 10 mph (16 km/h). On October 27, 2022, the Cyberquad for Kids was recalled by the U.S. Consumer Product Safety Commission for failing to comply with safety requirements for youth ATVs, including mechanical suspension and maximum tire pressure. The Cyberquad for Kids (Model 915) was made available for purchase again in November 2023, with the clarification that it is a toy, not an ATV. As of June 2026, it is priced at $1,650 in the U.S.

== See also ==
- Nikola Zero, an all-electric battery-powered off-road sport UTV
