= Fret (disambiguation) =

A fret is a raised portion on the neck of a stringed instrument.

Fret or FRET may also refer to:

- Förster resonance energy transfer or fluorescence resonance energy transfer; a fluorescence phenomenon with applications in biology and chemistry
- FRET or Formal Requirements Elicitation Tool
- Fret (architecture), a repeated geometric ornament, forming a frieze
- Fret (heraldry), a heraldic charge
- FRET (magazine), a free magazine about the pop music scene in the Netherlands
- SNCF Fret, the rail freight organisation of the SNCF
- worry, as in to fret about something
- Sea fret or haar, a cold sea fog

== See also ==
- Fretter, an American electronics retailer
- Fretting, wear and corrosion damage at the asperities of contact surfaces
