= Aperam =

International steel company

Aperam S.A.
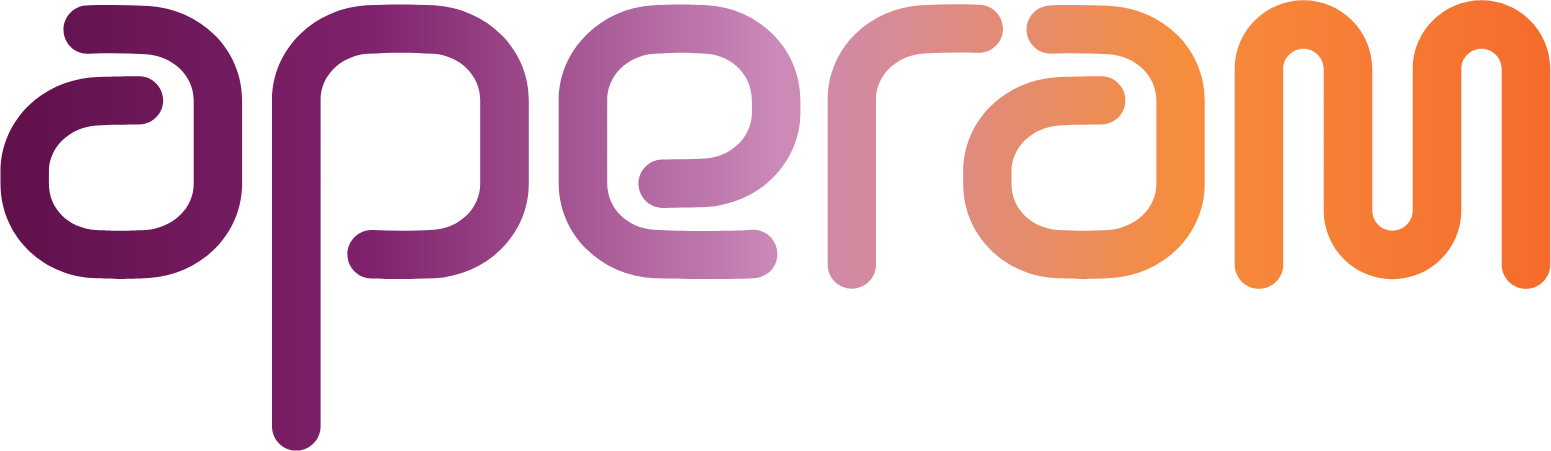
- Type: Société Anonyme
- Traded as: Euronext Amsterdam: APAM; LuxSE: APAM; BEL 20 component CAC Mid 60 component
- Industry: Metals
- Founded: 2011
- Headquarters: Luxembourg, Luxembourg
- Area served: Worldwide
- Key people: Lakshmi N. Mittal (Chairman); Sud Sivaji (Chief Executive Officer)
- Products: Stainless, alloys and specialty steels
- Revenue: €6.08 billion (2025)
- Operating income: €16 million (2025)
- Net income: €9 million (2025)
- Total assets: €5.354 billion (2025)
- Number of employees: 13,000 (2025)
- Website: www.aperam.com

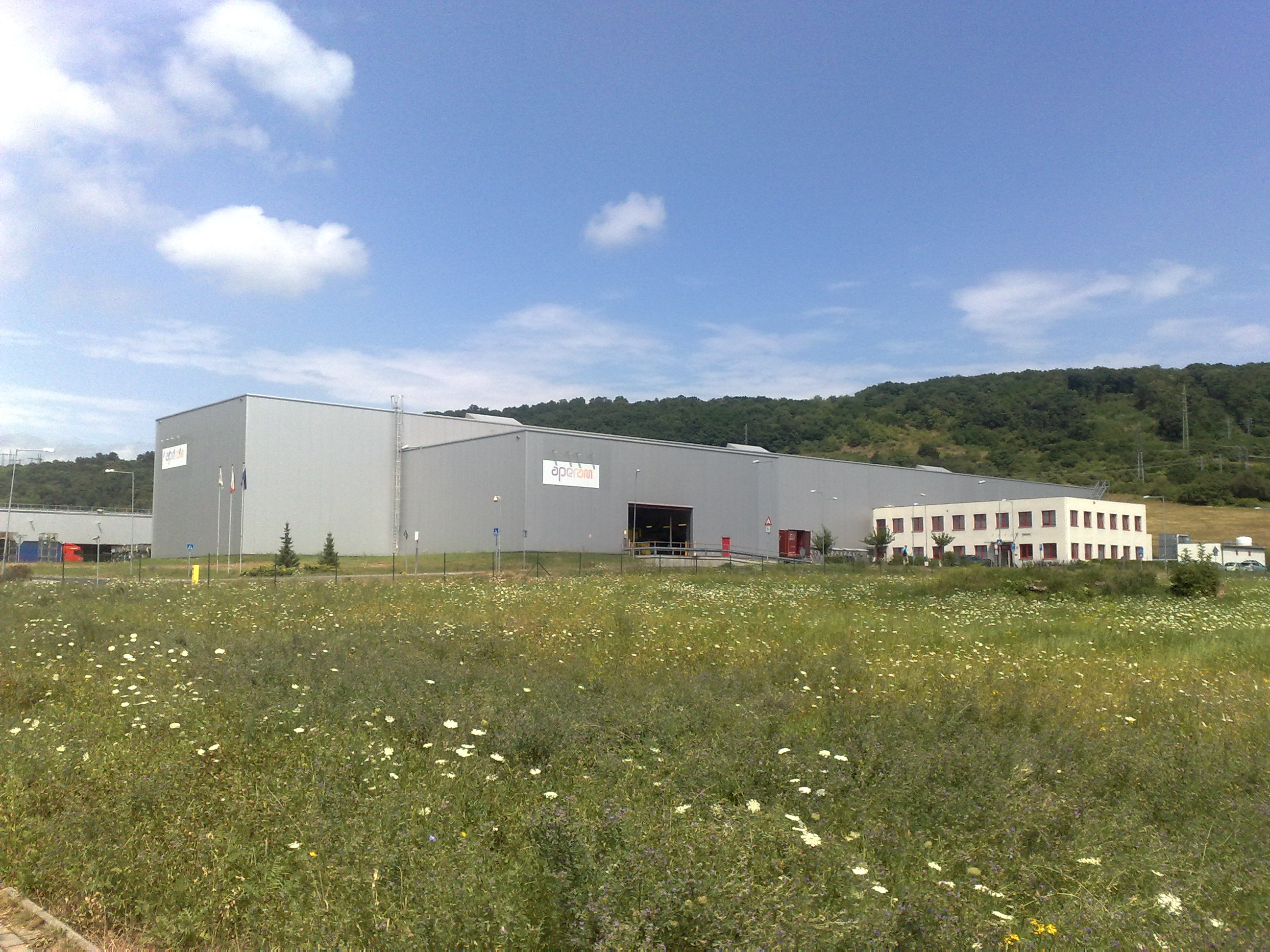
Aperam in Ústí nad Labem - Czech Republic

Aperam S.A. is a global leader in stainless, electrical, alloy and specialty steels, with recycling activities and customers across more than 40 countries. The company is listed on the Amsterdam, Brussels, Paris, Madrid and Luxembourg stock exchanges with facilities in Brazil, Belgium and France, which concentrates on the production of stainless steel and speciality steel.

Aperam is also a leading producer of alloys and high-value specialty products, with operations in France, China, India, and the United States.

It was spun out of ArcelorMittal at the start of 2011; the facilities that became Aperam had about 27% by turnover of the stainless-steel market as of 2009.

The Brazilian facility uses charcoal from a series of eucalyptus forests owned and managed by the group rather than coking coal to reduce the material; the European facilities use electric-arc furnaces fed with scrap. The use of charcoal reduces the CO_{2} footprint of the facility.

== Corporate history ==
The Brazilian facilities of Aperam mostly correspond to Aperam South America (old Acesita), which was privatised by the Brazilian government in 1992 and purchased by Usinor in 1998.

Usinor merged with Arbed and Aceralia to become Arcelor in 2001, and Aperam became a wholly owned subsidiary of ArcelorMittal in 2007 in the hostile takeover of state-owned enterprise Arcelor by Lakshmi Mittal.

As of June 2021, 40.83% of Aperam is owned by the Lakshmi Mittal family.

Aperam completed the acquisition of Universal Stainless in January 2025.

Aperam finalized the acquisition of British company Magnatec Group in April 2026.

== See also ==
- List of steel producers
