= Fretter =

Defunct American electronics/appliance retailer

- Type: Electronics & appliance retailer
- Founded: 1950s
- Defunct: May 1996
- Fate: Bankrupt
- Headquarters: Detroit, Michigan
- Key people: Oliver Fretter, founder

Fretter was an electronics and major appliance retailer based in Detroit, founded in the 1950s by Oliver "Ollie" Fretter.

== History ==
The company's founder and spokesman, Ollie Fretter, became known in the Detroit area in the 1970s and 1980s via TV commercials in which he promised, "I’ll give you five pounds of coffee if I can't beat your best deal. The competition knows me. You should too!" When occasionally he had to make good on the whimsical offer, Fretter gave away one-pound cans of coffee that had been relabeled "net weight — 5 pounds".

The company paid its salespeople on a draw against commissions program, although they were paid spiffs instead of pure commission. Spiffs were calculated based on profit margin and other incentives, not based on the price of the product. Salespeople were not encouraged to sell the more expensive unit, but a model not carried by the competition which couldn't be directly price compared and therefore had a higher mark-up. Salespeople learned that the coin endings of the products directed them to which item to sell. Products with a .97 ending were high margin items and paid well; while .86 were not as profitable, and .75 were advertised items that paid very little. Clearance items were priced with repeating numbers like .66, .55, and .33 depending on the age of the item. Special order and hard-to-find items were priced with .71 endings and while they paid comparable to a .97 item a salesperson may get burned when the item was not in stock and/or delays in new stock arriving.

Fretter maintained its marketing strategy as a low-cost retailer, even hiring outside research companies to compare prices with competitors and making that information available to sales people at their point-of-sale terminals. The move did little to sway public opinion since the chain sold higher end goods than its competitors but did not make that point clear in its advertising. While Fretter and its competitors both sold a brand, they rarely sold the same models within the brand.

Fretter owned a small chain of mobile electronics retailers, DASH Concepts, that installed car audio, security, and other similar products. Serving Detroit and Cleveland areas it had its main warehouse in Dearborn, Michigan, in the same building as one of the Fretter stores.

The Detroit electronics retailing market was upended when the largest company, Highland Superstores, ceased operation in 1993. Best Buy saw this as an opportunity to move into new territory, areas it previously felt were oversaturated by Highland and other major competitors like Fretter. Fretter management had been working to compete with the superstore model by becoming one of its own. It bought employee-owned Fred Schmid stores, giving the chain hold of markets in the mountain states. Fretter moved its corporate offices to Colorado and oversaw the merger from there. In 1993, Fretter also acquired their biggest competition of the time Silo Electronics, a company that had previously not turned a profit since the 1980s. This was an attempt by Fretter to compete with its new major competition, electronic superstores Circuit City and Best Buy, which were larger than Fretter's stores. The merger temporarily made Fretter the second largest retailer in this category, after Circuit City and larger than Best Buy, based on previous store sales, but Fretter immediately began closing redundant locations; where the company now had two or more stores in the same neighborhood. Fretter returned its main office to the Detroit area, to Brighton, Michigan. The company wanted to rebrand itself as YES! (Your Electronics Superstore) but this move did not make it to any of the stores; they all retained their original designations of Silo, Fretter, Fred Schmid, DASH Concepts, and other.

The acquisition, assumption of Silo debt and lack of liquid assets, lead the company into Chapter 11 bankruptcy, forcing the chain to close many locations. All Silo Electronics stores closed by 1995, with all Fretter locations closing by May 1996.

Oliver Fretter died on June 29, 2014, at the age of 91.
