= List of boycotts =

This is a list of boycotts.

== Past – Miscellaneous ==
Time frame	Participants	Target	Cause	Main article	References
March 1769	Philadelphia merchants First Continental Congress	Great Britain	Opposition to colonial taxation without representation	Continental Association	
1848	Milan	Austria	Austrian state monopolies	Five Days of Milan	
1880	Irish Land League	Charles Boycott (origin of the term boycott)	Desired land reform in Ireland		
1891	Iranian Shia	United Kingdom	The Shah's granting of a tobacco monopoly to Britain	Tobacco Protest	
1891–1950	Australian unionists and local residents	Local publicans and hotels around Australia	Poor wages and working conditions for staff in hotels and the high cost of alcohol, accommodation and food		
1902	Jews in New York City	Kosher meat products	Price increases causing unaffordability	1902 kosher meat boycott	
1904–1906	China	United States	The Chinese Exclusion Act of 1902, an extension of the original Act of 1882 Chinese Exclusion Act		
1905–1907	Indian National Congress; Indian independence movement	British Raj	Opposition to the partition of Bengal and a desire for Indian economic independence	Swadeshi movement	
1912	Tunisia	Compagnie des tramways de Tunis, all Italian businesses in Tunis	Young Tunisians	Tunis Tram Boycott	
1919	China	Japan	May Fourth Movement	Chinese boycotts of Japanese products	
1919–1922	Indian National Congress; Mahatma Gandhi	British Raj	Opposition to the Rowlett Act and demands for self-rule	Non-cooperation movement	
1920		Overalls producers	High cost of clothing	Overall clothing boycott movement	
1927	American Jews	Ford Motor Company	Antisemitism by Henry Ford in The Dearborn Independent		
1930–1934	Indian National Congress; Mahatma Gandhi; Jawaharlal Nehru	British Raj	Demands for Indian independence	Civil disobedience movement	
March 1933	American Jewish Congress; International critics of Nazism	Nazi Germany	Antisemitism in Nazi Germany	Anti-Nazi boycott of 1933	
April 1933	Nazi Germany	German Jews	Anti-Nazi boycotts	Nazi boycott of Jewish businesses	
1941–1951	Iraq	Iraqi Jews	Farhud		
1942–1945	Indian National Congress; Mahatma Gandhi; Jawaharlal Nehru	British Raj	Demands for Indian independence	Quit India	
1948	Nii Kwabena Bonne III; Kwame Nkrumah	Association of West African Merchants	Price inflation	1948 Accra riots	
1950	Soviet Union	United Nations	The UN not recognising the People's Republic of China as 'China'	Soviet Union boycott of the United Nations	
1955–1968	African Americans	Various	Racial segregation in the United States	Civil Rights Movement; Montgomery bus boycott	
1961–1983	West Berlin	Berlin S-Bahn	East German operation of the S-Bahn	Berlin S-Bahn	
	United Farm Workers	Grapes and lettuce in retail grocery stores	Labor disputes	Delano grape strike	
1960s–1990	Various academics	South African universities	Apartheid	Academic boycott of South Africa	
	Various	South African produce	Apartheid	Disinvestment from South Africa	
1966–1987	Various	Coors Brewing Company	Anti-LGBT hiring practices Discrimination towards minorities and women and anti-unionism	Coors strike and boycott	
Early April 1973	Americans	Meat products	Increasing prices	1973 meat boycott	
1984–1993	INFACT	General Electric	Production and promotion of nuclear weapons	Corporate Accountability International	
1988–1994	Australian Rainforest Action Groups	Companies importing rainforest timber from Malaysia to Australia	Prevention of the destruction of Indigenous owned rainforests		
1989–1998	Rainforest Action Network	Mitsubishi	Rainforest destruction through its forestry activities	Boycott Mitsubishi Campaign	
1990–1991	African Americans in New York	Korean-American businesses	Racial tensions	Family Red Apple boycott	
1991–1998	Friends of the Lubicon	Daishowa	Proposed logging of Lubicon Cree territory		
1996	CDU/CSU	Mission: Impossible, Phenomenon and Chick Corea	Association of Corea, Tom Cruise, and John Travolta with Scientology, which is not legally recognized in Germany	Mission Impossible (film) § Marketing	
1990s–2000	Andrew Vachss	Thailand	Prostitution of children in Thailand	Don't! Buy! Thai!	
1998–2003	American gun owners	Colt; Smith & Wesson	Colt and Smith & Wesson's cooperation with Bill Clinton's gun control efforts		
2001–2002	Greenpeace; Friends of the Earth; People & Planet	Esso/ExxonMobil	Esso's climate change denial and lack of investment in renewable energy	Stop Esso campaign	
2003	US conservatives	Various celebrities, such as the Dixie Chicks	Celebrity opposition to the 2003 invasion of Iraq	Dixie Chicks comments on George W. Bush	
2005	Association of University Teachers	Bar-Ilan University; University of Haifa	Bar-Ilan's operations in the West Bank; Haifa's discipline of a lecturer	Association of University Teachers § Boycott of Israeli universities 2005	
2005–2006	Greenpeace and Sea Shepherd	Nissui Company, Sealord Tuna, Gorton's Seafood	Involvement of parent company in whaling		
2005–2013	International Labor Rights Fund and others	Firestone Tire and Rubber Company	Forced labour and child labour on rubber plantations in Liberia	Firestone Natural Rubber Company	
1 May 2006	Illegal immigrants in the United States	US businesses and schools	US immigration policy	Great American Boycott	
2008	German labor unions	Nokia	Nokia's closing of a German plant		
2008	Stonewall	Heinz	Heinz's pulling of a commercial featuring two men kissing		
2009	Various countries	Durban Review Conference	Scope of the conference	Durban Review Conference § Boycotts	
2010	Various	BP	Deepwater Horizon oil spill	Reactions to the Deepwater Horizon oil spill § Public reaction	
2010	Various	Arizona	Racial profiling law		
2011	Israelis	Tnuva	Rising food prices and price gouging	Cottage cheese boycott	
2011	Various countries	Durban Review Conference	Concerns over antiseminitism, racism, and anti-Zionism	Durban III § Countries Boycotting	
2013–2020	350.org	Numerous Australian banks, universities, and local governments	Divestment from fossil fuels		
2018	Moroccans	Bottled water and dairy products	Price gouging and corruption	2018 Moroccan boycott	
2019	Residents of Louisiana	National Football League; CBS Sports	Negligence in rules enforcement that kept the New Orleans Saints out of Super Bowl LIII	2018 NFC Championship Game	
2023	Various subreddits	Reddit	Reddit's intentions to charge for its API service	Reddit API controversy	
2024	Social media users, primarily TikTokers	Various celebrities and social media influencers	Support for Israel in, or lack of action over, the Gaza war	Blockout 2024	
2025	Dave Portnoy (withdrew), Christian McCaffrey, Cheryl Bosa, Bills Mafia	National Football League; Fox Sports	Alleged match fixing and officiating misconduct in favor of the Kansas City Chiefs, particularly in the 2024 AFC Championship Game	Super Bowl LIX boycott	
2025	Various	Avelo Airlines	Avelo signing an agreement for a long-term charter program flying for the U.S. Department of Homeland Security's Immigration and Customs Enforcement		
2025	Roblox players, parents, safety advocates, and other online communities	Roblox (specifically The Hatch)	The Hatch's inclusion of TheOfficialTeddy, who had a history of exposing children to inappropriate topics	Child safety on Roblox § Sex games	

== Sporting ==
Event	Participants	Host nation	Cause	Main article	References
1936 Summer Olympics	Athletes from 22 nations	Nazi Germany	German fascism and Nazism	People's Olympiad	
1938 FIFA World Cup	Various South American nations	France	Selection of a second successive World Cup in Europe		
1939 International University Games (Vienna)	Confédération Internationale des Étudiants	Nazi Germany	German annexation of Austria		
1956 Summer Olympics	Cambodia, Egypt, Iraq, Lebanon, Netherlands, Spain, Switzerland, China	Australia	Suez Crisis, presence of the Soviet Union after the Hungarian Revolution, and the presence of Taiwan		
1964 Summer Olympics	China, North Korea, Indonesia	Japan	Suspension of Indonesia	GANEFO	
1966 FIFA World Cup	31 Confederation of Africa Football nations	United Kingdom	Play-off qualifications and readmission of apartheid South Africa	1966 FIFA World Cup § African boycott	
1974 FIFA World Cup qualification (UEFA–CONMEBOL play-off)	Soviet Union	Chile	1973 Chilean coup d'état		
1976 Summer Olympics	Various African nations	Canada	Participation of New Zealand, which had sporting contact with apartheid South Africa	Sporting boycott of South Africa during the Apartheid era	
1980 Summer Olympics	United States; Various nations	Soviet Union	Soviet–Afghan War	1980 Summer Olympics boycott	
1984 Summer Olympics	Warsaw Pact states (except Romania); Cuba	United States	1980 Summer Olympics boycott	1984 Summer Olympics boycott Friendship Games	
1986 Commonwealth Games	32 Afro-Asian nations and 10 Caribbean nations	United Kingdom	The Thatcher Government's attitude towards sporting links with South Africa	Sporting boycott of South Africa during the Apartheid era	
1988 Summer Olympics	North Korea; Albania, Cuba, Madagascar, Nicaragua, Seychelles	South Korea	Korean conflict	1988 Summer Olympics boycott	
1995 South Pacific Games	Western Samoa, American Samoa, Nauru, Niue	French Polynesia	French nuclear weapons testing in Mururoa		
2017–18 Biathlon World Cup – Stage 9	United States, Canada, Czech Republic, Ukraine	Russia	Russian doping scandal Russo-Ukrainian War		
2022 Winter Olympics	Diplomats from various countries	China	Chinese human rights issues	Concerns and controversies at the 2022 Winter Olympics § Diplomatic boycotts or non-attendance	

== Ongoing ==
Initiation	Participants	Target	Cause	Main article	References
1949	Arab League	Israel	Partition of Palestine	Arab League boycott of Israel	
1977	Various	Nestlé	Nestlé's promotion of infant formula over breast milk in developing countries	Nestlé boycott	
1989	Liverpudlians	The Sun	The Sun's coverage of the Hillsborough disaster	Coverage of the Hillsborough disaster by The Sun § Merseyside boycott	
2003	Numerous union organizations, including SINALTRAINAL	Coca-Cola Company	Anti-union violence in Colombia and environmental degradation in India	Criticism of Coca-Cola	
2005	Various human rights and anti-occupation activists	Israel	Israeli–Palestinian conflict	Boycott, Divestment and Sanctions	
2005	Various Muslims worldwide	Denmark	Jyllands-Posten Muhammad cartoons controversy	Economic and social consequences of the Jyllands-Posten Muhammad cartoons controversy	
2008	Opponents of California Proposition 8	Supporters of California Proposition 8 and Utah	LDS Church support for Proposition 8	Protests against Proposition 8 supporters	
2008	Center for Biological Diversity	Bluefin Tuna fishing	Overfishing of Bluefin Tuna, leading to their status as an endangered species		
2009	LGBT groups	The Salvation Army	The Salvation Army's opposition to homosexuality		
2010	Canvass for a Cause and other LGBT groups	Target Corporation and Best Buy	Donations to politician Tom Emmer		
2010	Boycott BP	BP	Deepwater Horizon oil spill	Reactions to the Deepwater Horizon oil spill	
2011	LGBT groups	Chick-fil-A	Chick-fil-A's CEO's support of politicians who oppose same-sex marriage	Chick-fil-A same-sex marriage controversy	
2012	PETA	Air France	Shipping monkeys to laboratories for experimentation		
2013	Ecuadorian president Rafael Correa and various others	Chevron Corporation	Failure to adequately clean up widespread oil pollution in the Ecuadorian Amazon caused by the operations of Texaco, one of Chevron's subsidiaries	Lago Agrio oil field	
2013	Survival International	Botswana	Eviction of indigenous San people from the Central Kalahari Game Reserve.	Ancestral land conflict in Botswana	
2013	International Labor Rights Forum	Theo Chocolate	Not living up to "fair trade" label because of proven union busting		
2013	Palestinians living in the United States	Syria, Iran	Syria and Iran's treatment of Palestinians		
2013	Ukrainians	Russian products	Russian embargoes and the Russo-Ukrainian War	Do not buy Russian goods!	
2013-2014	LGBT groups	Russia, Stolichnaya vodka, 2014 Winter Olympics	Russia's anti-LGBT policies		
2014	Citizens of Washington, D.C.	Tourism to Maryland's 1st congressional district, Eastern Shore of Maryland	Interference in District of Columbia home rule	Boycott of Maryland's 1st congressional district	
2014	Various	Nabisco	Switching production of products from the United States to Mexico	Oreo boycott	
2015	Ethical Consumer	Amazon	Tax avoidance, poor treatment of workers, anti-competitive practices.	Criticism of Amazon	
2016	American Family Association	Target Corporation	Mixed sex bathrooms and changing areas		
2016	Various	Corporations backing Donald Trump	Policies and rhetoric of Donald Trump	GrabYourWallet	
2017	Right-wing commentators and fans of Andy Signore	Screen Junkies	Defy Media firing Signore due to allegations of sexual harassment		
2018	Various companies with ties to the NRA	National Rifle Association of America	Stoneman Douglas High School shooting	2018 NRA boycott	
2018	Various companies with ties to The Ingraham Angle, and The Ingraham Angle itself.	The Ingraham Angle	Laura Ingraham attacking Stoneman Douglas High School shooting survivor David Hogg	Boycott of The Ingraham Angle	
2018	Various companies with ties to Sinclair, and Sinclair itself.	Sinclair Broadcast Group	Conservative media bias of Sinclair; Sinclair mandating local news to attack certain news organizations	Boycott of Sinclair Broadcasting Group	
2018	Various	Nike, Inc.	Featuring of Colin Kaepernick in its advertising campaign, who sparked controversy by kneeling in protest during the national anthem	U.S. national anthem kneeling protests	
2019	Right-wing commentators and fans of Vic Mignogna	Crunchyroll, LLC, and Rooster Teeth	Severing of ties with Vic Mignogna following sexual harassment allegations		
2019	Various	Turkey	Turkish invasion of Rojava	2019 Turkish offensive into north-eastern Syria	
2019	South Koreans	Japan	Japan–South Korea trade dispute	2019 boycott of Japanese products in South Korea	
2020	Indians	China	2020–2021 China–India skirmishes	Boycott of China in India	
2020	Muslim world	France (products)	French response to the murder of Samuel Paty	Murder of Samuel Paty	
2021	American conservatives	The Walt Disney Company	Disney's firing of Gina Carano from the Disney+ series The Mandalorian		
2022	Various multinational corporations	Russia and Belarus	Response to the 2022 Russian invasion of Ukraine	Boycott of Russia and Belarus	
2022	Romanians	Austria	Austrian veto on Romania's bid to join the Schengen Area		
2022	Twitter users and advertisers	Twitter (X)	Increase of hate speech on Twitter, and Elon Musk's political activities	Twitter under Elon Musk	
2022 (accelerated in 2025)	Tesla consumers	Tesla	Elon Musk's political activities, primarily the Department of Government Efficiency from 2025	Tesla Takedown	
2023	American conservatives	Project Veritas	Project Veritas' removal of James O'Keefe.		
2023	American conservatives	Anheuser-Busch (specifically Bud Light)	Bud Light's sponsorship of Dylan Mulvaney	Bud Light boycott	
2023	American conservatives	Activision (Call of Duty)	Call of Duty supporting Pride Month after removing a pack dedicated to Nickmercs		
2024	Canadians, spearheaded by the subreddit r/loblawsisoutofcontrol	Loblaws stores and its divisions	Accusations of greedflation amidst rising profits as grocery prices increase	2024 Loblaw boycott	
2025	Southeastern Europeans	Major retail stores	Inflation and high food prices	2025 Southeast Europe retail boycotts	
2025	Numerous people worldwide	United States	Donald Trump's tariffs and threats to annex territory (Canada and Denmark)	2025 United States boycott (in Canada: 2025 Canadian boycott of the United States)	
2025	The People's Union USA, and other organizations	Various companies, including Amazon, Target, and Walmart	Reversal of diversity, equity and inclusion policies, the Department of Government Efficiency's actions in the United States federal government and corporate greed in general	Economic Blackout	
2025	Nintendo consumers	Nintendo (specifically Nintendo Switch 2)	Accusations of corporate greed and anti-consumerism after revealing the Nintendo Switch 2's price		
2025	Various YouTubers, privacy experts, safety advocates, and other online communities	Google (specifically YouTube)	Google's enforcement of "age assurance" policies for selected users	Criticism of Google	
2025	Various	Roblox	Roblox's ban of and threats to sue Schlep amidst concerns of child safety on the platform	Roblox–Schlep controversy	
2025	Numerous people and other organizations	The Walt Disney Company (specifically ABC), Nexstar Media Group, and Sinclair Broadcast Group	Indefinite suspension of Jimmy Kimmel Live! following statements made regarding the MAGA movement's reaction to the assassination of Charlie Kirk	Suspension of Jimmy Kimmel Live!	
2025	Various	Microsoft (specifically the Xbox Game Pass)	Price hikes of the Xbox Game Pass and corporate greed in general		
2025	American conservatives	Netflix (specifically Dead End: Paranormal Park)	Netflix's support of LGBTQ characters		
2025	Various	Various companies, including TikTok, X, Instagram, Hulu, HBO Max, Snapchat, Spotify, and YouTube	Running recruitment advertisements from ICE	Criticism of Spotify	
2025	Numerous people and other organizations	The Walt Disney Company	Usage of Generative AI and VFX techniques	Criticism of the Walt Disney Company	
2025	Numerous people and other organizations	Paramount Skydance (specifically CBS)	Censorship of the episode 60 Minutes episode "Inside CECOT"	Inside CECOT	
2025–2026	Iceland, Ireland, the Netherlands, Slovenia, and Spain	Eurovision Song Contest 2026	Israel's participation		
2026	Roblox players, parents, safety advocates, and other online communities	Roblox	Usage of age verification by uploading IDs or using facial scans to place users into age groups	Child safety on Roblox	
2026	Discord users, parents, safety advocates, and other online communities	Discord	Usage of age verification by uploading IDs or using facial scans following a data breach		
2026	Various	Sony Interactive Entertainment (PlayStation)	Sony's announcement of the end of production of physical discs for the PlayStation consoles		

== See also ==
- Moral purchasing
