= Project for Excellence in Journalism =

American organization that studies the press

- Established: 1997
- Director: Tom Rosenstiel

The Project for Excellence in Journalism was a tax-exempt research organization in the United States that used empirical methods to evaluate and study the performance of the press.

The organization's director was Tom Rosenstiel, a professor of journalism who has served as a media critic and political correspondent for the Los Angeles Times and Newsweek.

The organization was founded in 1997, and it was formerly affiliated with the Columbia School of Journalism.

In 2006, it separated from Columbia University and joined the Pew Research Center, funded by the Pew Charitable Trusts, a private organization.

In January 2014 the Project for Excellence in Journalism was renamed the Pew Research Center's Journalism Project.

== News Coverage Index ==
Every week the Project for Excellence in Journalism produced the News Coverage Index, a report identifying the main subjects covered by the U.S. mainstream media and analyses the percentage of the available space, or news hole, devoted to each major subject. It was used to analyze media coverage of events such as Occupy Wall Street.
