= Consumer activism =

Type of activist behavior

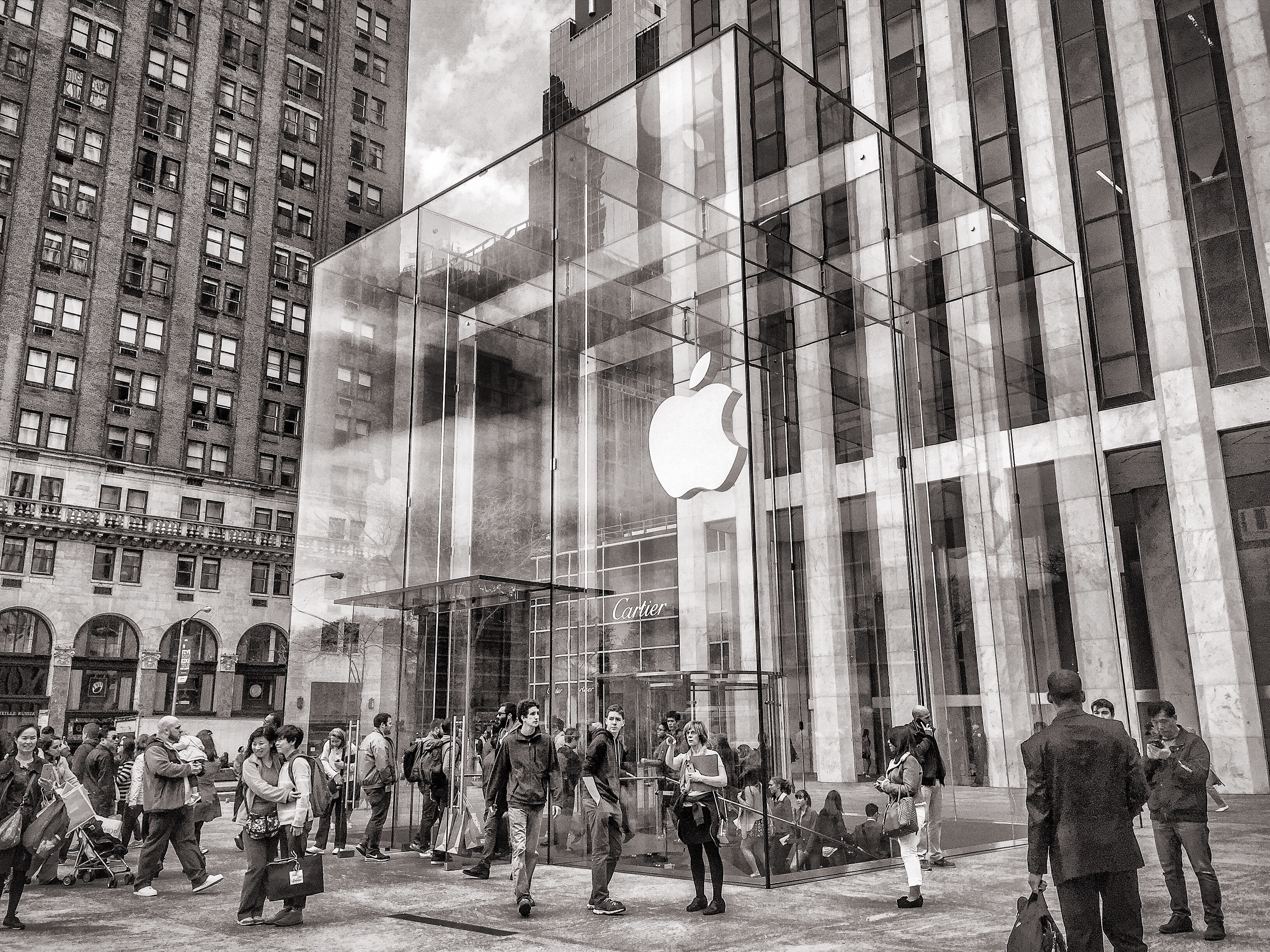
Apple store in Central Park, a symbol of consumerism.

Consumer activism is a process by which activists seek to influence the way in which goods or services are produced or delivered. Kozinets and Handelman define it as any social movement that uses society's drive for consumption to the detriment of business interests. For Eleftheria Lekakis, author of Consumer Activism: Promotional Culture and Resistance, it includes a variety of consumer practices that range from boycotting and ‘buycotting’ to alternative economic practices, lobbying businesses or governments, practising minimal or mindful consumption, or addressing the complicity of advertising in climate change. Consumer activism includes both activism on behalf of consumers for consumer protection and activism by consumers themselves. Consumerism is made up of the behaviors, institutions, and ideologies created from the interaction between people and the materials and services they consume. Consumer activism has several aims:

- Change the social structure of consumption
- Protect the social welfare of stakeholders
- Satisfy perceived slights to the ego
- Seek justice for the consumer and environment in the relationships of consumerism

== History ==
Historian Lawrence B. Glickman identifies the free produce movement of the late 1700s as the beginning of consumer activism in the United States. Like members of the British abolitionist movement, free produce activists were consumers themselves, and under the idea that consumers share in the responsibility for the consequences of their purchases, boycotted goods produced with slave labor in an attempt to end slavery. Other early consumer activism included the creation of consumer cooperatives in Northwestern England in 1844 as a measure against local monopolies and high commodity prices.

Activism on behalf of the consumer began around the 20th Century in the United States, in what scholars Tim Lang and Yiannis Gabriel term the "value-for-consumer" wave, and which sociologist Hayagreeva Rao calls the antiadulteration movement. At this time consumer organizations emerged in the United States, starting with a Consumers League in New York in 1891 which merged with other regional branches to form the National Consumers League in 1898. One of the first consumer protection laws in the United States and worldwide, the Pure Food and Drug Act, was passed in 1906 during the first wave of the U.S. consumer movement. More legislation around the world followed. During this time consumer-led activism like boycotts continued, largely in response to domestic and international socio-political concerns.

The publication of Unsafe at Any Speed by Ralph Nader in 1965 gave rise to a new type of legal-focused, anti-corporate activism. Whereas past activism had focused on the consequences of consumer actions and the protection of consumers, Lang and Gabriel argue the activism inspired by Ralph Nader and others is more confrontational toward the market. By the 1980s and 1990s, consumer activists increasingly turned to labels and certification schemes (organic, fair trade, cruelty-free, carbon footprint, etc.) as tools to promote ethical consumerism. These market-based campaigns reframed private purchasing decisions as a form of political and ethical activism. From the 1990s and into the 21st century, consumer activism has been closely associated with sharp critiques of globalization and the damaging effects of concentrated corporate power.

== Objectives and tactics ==
Consumer activism seeks to change how goods or services are produced in order to make the production process safer, more ethical, more environmentally friendly, and to make the products themselves safer and of better quality, or more available to consumers. Consumer activism challenges corporate practices in order to effect a change in production, or attempts to modify the behavior of consumers themselves. More recently, the politics of race and gender have taken centre-stage in consumer activism campaigns.

Scholars Robert V. Kozinets and Jay M. Handelman find that consumer activism needs three factors: "a goal, a self-representation, and an adversary." In this model, the goal is the change consumer activists wish to effect in the way goods or services are produced or in the way consumers approach consumption. Consumer activists may frame the purchase of a good or service as a moral choice, with the consumer partly responsible for aspects of the production. In this way, consumer activists attempt to influence the behavior of consumers by getting them to consider their consumption choices in an ethical light, and portray consumer activism as a movement among consumers, themselves included, for a common good. Consumer activists may also be part of various consumer organizations or portray themselves as members of a larger consumer movement.

The targets of consumer activism are often corporations that support causes or practices consumer activists find unethical. Corporations face consumer activism because of the way they do business or because of organizations they choose to support, financially or otherwise. Consumer activism may also target the state to encourage it to implement some form of regulation for consumer protection.

Consumer activist tactics can include boycotts, petitioning the government, media activism, and organizing interest groups. Boycotts are especially prevalent among consumer activists within environmental and animal rights activist groups. According to research from Eastern Michigan University, boycotts that are media-oriented rather than marketplace-oriented are preferred. A media-oriented boycott does not target actual consumption, by demonstrating in front of a storefront for example, but instead demonstrations are oriented to getting media attention, for example by demonstrating in front of the rival headquarters. Media-oriented consumer activism may also target advertising practices. In 2025, Kong Junyou, a student at Shanghai University, filmed a five-day protest against intrusive elevator advertising in which he shut down more than 100 advertising screens. Kong said that he hoped to encourage change in the advertising industry, while online responses included calls to boycott brands that purchased elevator advertising. Consumer boycotts damage a brand's reputation and can result in short term dips in a company's stock prices. While these dips may be forgettable in terms of the company's overall revenue, especially when the company may be among the top global brands, these boycotts can quickly gain attention and cause fast mobilization due to the rapid pace of information spreading across the internet and even be successful in causing policy change or restructuring of leadership if the boycott represents a major societal issue or movement instead of an isolated, independent effort. Daniel Diermeier, writing in the Harvard Review, argues that boycotts are most effective when the issue the boycott is targeting is simple and easy to understand, with low cost of mobilization and many alternatives for consumers to turn toward. Boycotts are occasionally criticized for being ineffective but the media appeal and a few big successes from groups like PETA have sustained their popularity. Consumer boycotts have also been an effective strategy for African Americans to gain equality in employment, access to public spaces such as shopping centers, or other various political objectives. As mentioned above the use of storefront sidewalks and window displays as a means for consumer activism can also be noted. Suffragists in San Francisco used these public spaces to access the vast network of consumers shopping in the downtown boutiques in order to “sell” suffrage to both the men and women of California. Using the displays and advertising techniques employed by retailers, the women of San Francisco were able to successfully use consumer spaces to campaign for their suffrage.

The Internet plays a major role in modern consumer activism, allowing widespread consumer interest groups to support each other in their efforts to resist globalized consumption patterns. This is especially true as anti-brand and anti-corporation groups seek to create a coordinated opposition as multinational and interregional as the opposed business. Often these communities centrally accumulate and share resources and information. In these and other strategies, consumer activists seek to increase the exposure of their cause and to gain political support. The speed, convenience, and propensity for coalition-building make the internet an ideal place for consumers to run their activism. The Internet allows for more mobilization by supporters, both inside and outside the group, to protest and get their message heard. At the same time, the internet and various platforms are part of a digital economy that favours and promote consumerism, which is contrary to classic aims of consumer activism.

Activist boycotts function under the model that a consumer's money serves as a vote of support for the business from which they bought something, a model which adds social responsibility for the consumer, as they must be knowledgeable about a company's and its competition's policies and stances in order to make the most informed decisions each time they make a purchase. The boycott tactic is not more often utilized by or slanted toward any specific political party in the United States as there are many boycott efforts that champion both conservative and liberal stances.

== Underlying Causes and Significant Outcomes ==
=== Brand Activism ===
Businesses, organizations, and corporations hold social responsibility for participating in social activism, that stems from either human right, violations, political conditions, religion etc. Brand Activism is driven by positive and negative consumer reactions,it is not universally agreeable, rather it supports controversial and partisan actions.

=== Employee Response ===
Employee responses heavily influence and shape a brand's response to social change. The brand must consider CBI (Consumer Based Identity), values, beliefs, and attitudes that the consumer holds.While also meeting the interests and demands of employees. Corporations, businesses, and organizations must meet the interests and demands of employee's as they are heavily influenced by organizational pride and leadership that aligns with their values and beliefs. This occurs because Social Identity Theory shows us how leadership approaches to moral decisions influences the employee's participation in holding to the responsibility of their role.

=== Consumer Response ===
When brands advocate for social change, their reputation is shaped by the public perception. Brands can receive support, or disengagement in response to taking action on their social responsibility. Consumers may react in admiration, as they felt appreciation, awe, or respect. Furthermore, based on a brand's consistency and value driven actions consumers may perceive brand authenticity so their loyalty may deepen. On the other hand, consumers may respond in anger based on their perception of the brand's action and connection. Specifically, one may feel their expectations were violated, or that the company's motive was egoistic. Lastly, if a consumer is suspicious of an organization that is "woke-washing", where activism and social change does not remain the main priority and instead companies prioritize profit and sales.

==== Consumer Empowerment ====
Consumer Sovereignty drives empowerment to others. It is when consumer activism, asserts consumer power, and directs the decisions that organizations take. Consumers overall feel motivated, supported, and empowered to participate. The empowerment of consumers creates a shared identity, motivates consumers to demand change, and promotes consumer rights and protection. In summary, consumer activism can expand consumer's political participation, further understand the consequences of consumption and allows them to empathize with others when social justice violations occur to an underrepresented community.

=== Movements ===
==== African American Consumer Activism in the 1930s ====
African American grassroots consumer activism in the 1930s focused primarily on securing their rights as consumers rather than with issues of consumer protection. Historically, African Americans have been excluded from opportunities to work white-collar jobs, instead finding themselves both sustained and exploited in domestic service and farming roles. Kelly Miller, a Howard University sociologist, referred to African Americans as “the surplus man, the last to be hired and the first to be fired”. The Great Depression exacerbated these economic vulnerabilities, and by 1933 nearly two million African Americans were out of work nationwide. In response, African American consumers put economic pressure on local white-owned businesses by choosing to shop at African American owned businesses, thus using familiar boycott tactics on a mass scale across major northern cities. The “Don’t Buy Where You Can’t Work” campaign turned the racial segregation of urban communities into an opportunity to economically support African American capitalists while simultaneously protesting the continued exploitation of African American labor by white employers. The campaign was considered successful in ushering an increase of African American employment rates, opportunities for advancement and promotion, and a strengthening of purchasing power. The movement also provided a basic template for direct-action Civil Rights activists to use in the 1960s, such as the Montgomery Bus Boycotts or lunch counter sit-ins.

==== The OPA and Wartime Consumer Activism ====
The popularity and support for the Office of Price Administration’s wartime rationing systems and price control policies depended on the American women who served as their households main shopper. Grassroots community-based organizations, local government agencies and OPA officials targeted women in an attempt to persuade them to join local boards in charge of rationing and price control. These local boards were often led by women and helped ensure compliance to OPA stabilization policies through recurring meetings with grocery stores, where they would report any potential rule breaking to their local OPA official.

Many of the women consumer activists that worked with the OPA often had experience with other sorts of activist groups such as localized consumer groups or labor unions. These groups' agendas were often aligned with the OPA’s, and in part used the OPA’s legally established framework to organize their own groups.

This mutual relationship between consumer activists and the OPA allowed for consumers to be ensured of their rights to product information and fair prices while simultaneously ensuring the effectiveness of the OPAs policies and their interests. By mobilizing thousands of women across the country, the OPA was able to effectively “Hold the Line”, and keep inflation prices down during World War Two. With the promise of postwar prosperity, women consumer activists all over the country were effectively motivated to stand up for their consumption rights.

African American consumers defended the OPA as both consumers and specifically as African American consumers as well. Many African American women were specifically interested in this issue of rent control. Although the OPA could not reverse the high prices and discrimination that African Americans faced in the housing market, they could still work to “prevent the extension of this abuse”. In the Washington D.C. office, the OPA had African American members on six of the fifteen price panels. The OPA also made special appeals to African American consumers, with one pamphlet reading “Negroes too, are Consumers”.

==== The 1990s ====
In what was described as the "granddaddy of all activist campaigns" Nike came under fire for utilizing subcontracted international factories to produce their products. Nike sweatshops became notorious for subpar working conditions and substandard pay. The reaction to this news resulted in an onslaught of activism that laid the foundation for modern consumer activism.

==== 2010 Greenpeace boycott against Kit Kat ====
Greenpeace found that palm oil production used in Kit Kats was destroying the rainforests and habitats of orangutans. Through social media activity, Greenpeace forced Kit Kat to cut all ties with Sinar Mas Group, the company that was providing the palm oil. Kit Kat later pledged to use only rainforest-sustainable palm oil by 2015. This movement is hailed as a notable success in consumer activism.

==== 2017 Delete Uber movement ====
After Donald Trump's Executive Order 13769 banned immigration from seven predominantly Muslim countries to the United States in January 2017, protests arose in many airports of the country. for not canceling its service and for allegedly using the event to profit during a Taxi Workers Alliance protest. This led to a Twitter campaign of #deleteuber in which more than 200,000 users deleted the app. CEO of Uber Travis Kalanick vacated his position as advisor in the economic advisory council of President Trump due to criticism over Trump and the travel ban.

==== #Boycottstarbucks Christmas Cup Campaign ====
After Starbucks released its winter-themed set of Christmas cups in 2015, Donald Trump declared a suggestion to boycott Starbucks. Trump represented himself as offended that the Starbucks cup did not portray the Christmas season with typical Christmas characters like Christmas trees, gifts, Santa, etc. Trump was an influence in this movement as a presidential candidate in 2015, and suggested that Starbucks was removing Christmas from the Christmas-holiday season. Starbucks was the target of backlash from conservative Trump supporters in 2017 after Starbucks CEO Howard Schultz spoke out in favor of employing refugees at various locations of the coffee shop chain after Trump proposed a travel ban targeted towards stopping Muslim Middle Eastern refugees from entering the United States.

==== #GrabYourWallet Boycott ====
A boycott was created by Shannon Coulter in October 2016 to protest against Donald Trump. The movement advocated boycotting stores and companies that carry Trump-affiliated items, such as Ivanka Trump's shoe line. The boycott did not only include clothing stores, but also included TV shows, such as The New Celebrity Apprentice, which was formerly hosted by Donald Trump.

==== 2022 Russian invasion of Ukraine ====
Following the 2022 Russian invasion of Ukraine which began on February 24, many international, particularly Western companies pulled out of Russia. Companies slow to announce any disinvestments or scaling back of their operations in Russia have been subject to criticism and calls for consumer boycott.

== Celebrity endorsements ==
Celebrities and influencers are often key actors behind acts or campaigns of consumer activism. To understand complex and sometimes controversial examples such as the below, Lekakis suggests that we understand each case with key issues in mind: 1) the political economy of celebrity, 2) the importance of problematizing consumer-friendly simplifications, 3) the importance of understanding celebrity in relation to colonial histories, and 4) in relation to gender and racial politics.

Donald Trump: Donald Trump promoted various consumer boycotts and consumer activism actions, such as with the Starbucks Boycott, where Trump suggested a boycott due to the Christmas cup controversy, as well as calling for a boycott of the NFL due to kneeling protests against police brutality towards people of color during the national anthem in 2017.

Lena Dunham: After Uber removed price surges following a taxi hour of solidarity for the immigration ban at the JFK airport, there was almost instantly a backlash from thousands of Uber users to delete the app, and Dunham engaged in the boycott by sending out a tweet indicating that she had deleted the app.

Elton John: In 2015 Elton John boycotted the designer brand Dolce and Gabbana after the designers Domenico Dolce and Stefano Gabbana made comments regarding same sex families and children conceived through IVF. Elton John then posted on instagram and wrote #BoycottDolceGabbana which gained a large amount of support.

Kid Rock: In 2023 Kid Rock promoted a boycott against the beer company Bud Light for its ad campaign with a transgender influencer. Bud Light was largely boycotted by conservatives due to the ad being seen as political. This boycott significantly impacted Bud Light's sales and continued to do so with sales 40% below pre-boycott sales by 2025.

== Criticism ==
Opponents of consumer activism often represent business interests. Some businesses have brought lawsuits against consumer groups for making negative comments about their products or services. Many of the suits have been successfully defended against on the grounds of free speech. Some cases against consumer activists have been dismissed under anti-SLAPP laws.

Consumer activism has also been the subject of debate regarding its long-term effectiveness. Many times companies and brands that have been boycotted bounce back and recover in sales. These companies that are targets of massive boycotts are able to get out of it with PR statements and promised reform, where substantive changes remain contested. Some boycotts can also produce unintended economic consequences for workers. Boycotts on companies in developing countries may negatively impact workers, including through job loss or reduced income.

Criticism has also increased with the expansion of social media. Digital platforms can facilitate the rapid spread of information and mobilization of participants. At the same time, research has suggested that these environments may encourage forms of engagement that are less sustained or based on limited information. This is associated with the framing of complex issues in simplified or binary terms, potentially obscuring broader social, economic, or political contexts. While consumer activism through social media can increase visibility and awareness, its role in producing long-term changes remains an area of ongoing discussion.

== Notable activists and organizations ==
Notable consumer organizations include Grahak Shakti (India), Public Citizen, Consumers Union, and Consumer Federation of America. These organizations protect consumer rights by testing products and helping consumers make informed choices. The Consumers Union participates in consumer activism with hundreds of thousands of "e-advocates" who write letters to policy makers. Early versions of consumer organizations were similar to trade unions in how they would boycott to try to improve the marketplace for the consumer.

=== Basecamp ===
The CEO of Basecamp, a Chicago-based tech company, chose to boycott Uber in 2017 by no longer reimbursing company and employee Uber rides, giving incentive to use other vehicle for hire companies. Jason Fried, the company's CEO, stated that making the decision to boycott Uber was easy, especially after the Susan J. Fowler controversy in early 2017, and for Fried, it was a matter of morals.

== Selected publications ==
- Lekakis, Eleftheria (2022). Consumer Activism: Promotional Culture and Resistance, London: Sage.
- Hilton, Matthew (2008). Prosperity for All: Consumer Activism in an Era of Globalization Cornell University Press ISBN 978-0-8014-7507-8
- Kozinets, Robert V.; Handelman, Jay M. (December 2004). "Adversaries of Consumption: Consumer Movements, Activism, and Ideology". Journal of Consumer Research. 31 (3): 691–704. doi:10.1086/425104. JSTOR 10.1086/425104.
- Sarkar, Christian and Kotler, Philip (2018). Brand Activism: From Purpose to Action. IDEA BITE PRESS.
- Friedman M (1995). On Promoting a Sustainable Future Through Consumer Activism. Journal of Social Issues.
- Glickman, Lawrence B. (2009). Buying Power: A History of Consumer Activism in America. University of Chicago Press ISBN 978-0-226-29865-8
- Mayer RN (1989). The Consumer Movement: Guardians of the Marketplace. Twayne Publishing
- Chesler MA (1991). Mobilizing consumer activism in health care: The role of self-help groups - Research in Social Movements, Conflicts and Change.

== See also ==
- Anti-consumerism
- Anti-corporate activism
- Consumers' cooperative
- Consumer protection
- Economic activism
- List of boycotts
- GameStop short squeeze
