= Eileen Hoats =

Eileen M. Hoats (born 1949) is an American consumer activist. She was elected president of the Consumer Federation of America in 1975. She also served as Executive Director of the Consumer Assembly of New York. Hoates left the New York State Consumer Protection Board in 1976 after Executive Director Rosemary Pooler came under criticism for
