= American Press Institute =

Organization

The American Press Institute is an educational non-advocacy 501(c)(3) nonprofit organization affiliated with the News Media Alliance (formerly the Newspaper Association of America).

== History ==
The institute, founded in 1946, initially was at the Columbia University Graduate School of Journalism before moving in 1974 to Reston, Virginia. It has been described by The Washington Post as the nation's "most venerable press-management and training organization." The institute's discussion leaders have included former Washington Post Executive Editor Ben Bradlee, former New York City mayor David Dinkins, Washington Post publisher Katharine Graham, and Pulitzer Prize-winner and former Poynter Institute chairman Eugene Patterson.

However, API's fortunes declined in parallel with those of American newspapers, which were once one of the most profitable businesses in the nation. The institute in early 2012 merged with the NAA Foundation of the Newspaper Association of America and shuttered its landmark headquarters. Starting in 2013, API's leadership led its transformation from a training institution to an "applied think tank," producing research, programs, events and tools that facilitate learning in the news industry mostly outside a traditional training model.

As of 2018, some of API's projects include:

- The Media Insight Project, a joint research initiative with the Associated Press-NORC Center for Public Affairs Research at the University of Chicago.
- Metrics for News, an analytics program and tool to help publishers understand how their audiences interact with their journalism.
- Thought Leader Summits, "one-day summits on focused topics of importance in the current journalism landscape."
- Programs on growing reader revenue, improving accountability journalism and succeeding at organizational change.

The center's director and CEO is Michael D. Bolden, a former managing editor at The San Francisco Chronicle and former managing director of the John S. Knight Journalism Fellowships at Stanford. Previously the institute was led by executive director Tom Rosentiel.

In 2023, the API launched a pilot program for the American Press Institute Inclusion Index across five newsrooms in Pittsburgh, Pennsylvania. The program seeks to improve the relationships between newsrooms and the diverse communities they cover.
