= Bill Kovach =

American journalist (born 1932)

Bill Kovach (Albanian: Bill Kovaçi, born 1932) is an American journalist, former Washington bureau chief of The New York Times, former editor of the Atlanta Journal-Constitution, and co-author of the book The Elements of Journalism: What Newspeople Should Know and The Public Should Expect.

== Biography ==
Born in 1932 in East Tennessee to Albanian parents, Kovach planned, after attending college at East Tennessee State University, to go to graduate school in marine biology. After four years in the U.S. Navy, a summer job at the Johnson City Press Chronicle in Johnson City, Tennessee, persuaded him to go into journalism.

Kovach covered the civil rights movement, politics and Appalachian poverty for the Nashville Tennessean from 1960 to 1967. In 1965, he was involved in a fight for public access to the legislature, when he refused to leave a committee hearing following a call for executive session. The state senate passed a resolution revoking his floor privileges. The Tennessean and editor John Seigenthaler, Sr. led a successful fight to open the legislative chambers.

After Kovach spent a year at Stanford University on a journalism fellowship, Scotty Reston of The New York Times' Washington bureau hired him in 1968, and he spent 18 years there, including serving as its Washington bureau chief.

Kovach was hired as the editor of the Atlanta Journal-Constitution in 1986, beginning two years of hard-hitting investigative articles, with the staff winning two Pulitzer Prizes and being finalists for several others. Stories on banks, Coca-Cola, and other topics ruffled feathers in Atlanta and among the corporate leadership of Cox Newspapers. Kovach resigned in 1988, with some insiders attributing the disputes with management over budget cuts and control of the Washington bureau, and others to a "take-no-prisoners" editorial approach.

Kovach moved on to Harvard University in 1989 as a fellow, then curator, of the Nieman Foundation for Journalism.

He retired from Harvard in 2001 and returned to Washington, where he is senior counselor to the Project for Excellence in Journalism.

Kovach is the North American representative and chair of the ICIJ (International Consortium of Investigative Journalists) Advisory Committee. He also serves on the faculty of the Missouri School of Journalism.

== Awards ==
In 2000, Kovach received the Elijah Parish Lovejoy Award as well as an honorary Doctor of Laws degree from Colby College. In 2007, he received an honorary doctorate from Boston University.

He founded the Committee of Concerned Journalists, which worked to increase the quality of journalism.

Besides The Elements of Journalism, Kovach is a co-author of Warp Speed: America in the Age of Mixed Media and Blur: How to Know What's True in the Age of Information Overload, all with Tom Rosenstiel.

In 2002, when it was discovered that USA Today reporter Jack Kelley had fabricated some of his stories, USA Today turned to Kovach, along with veteran editors Bill Hilliard and John Seigenthaler Sr., to monitor the investigation.
