= Tom Rosenstiel =

American author

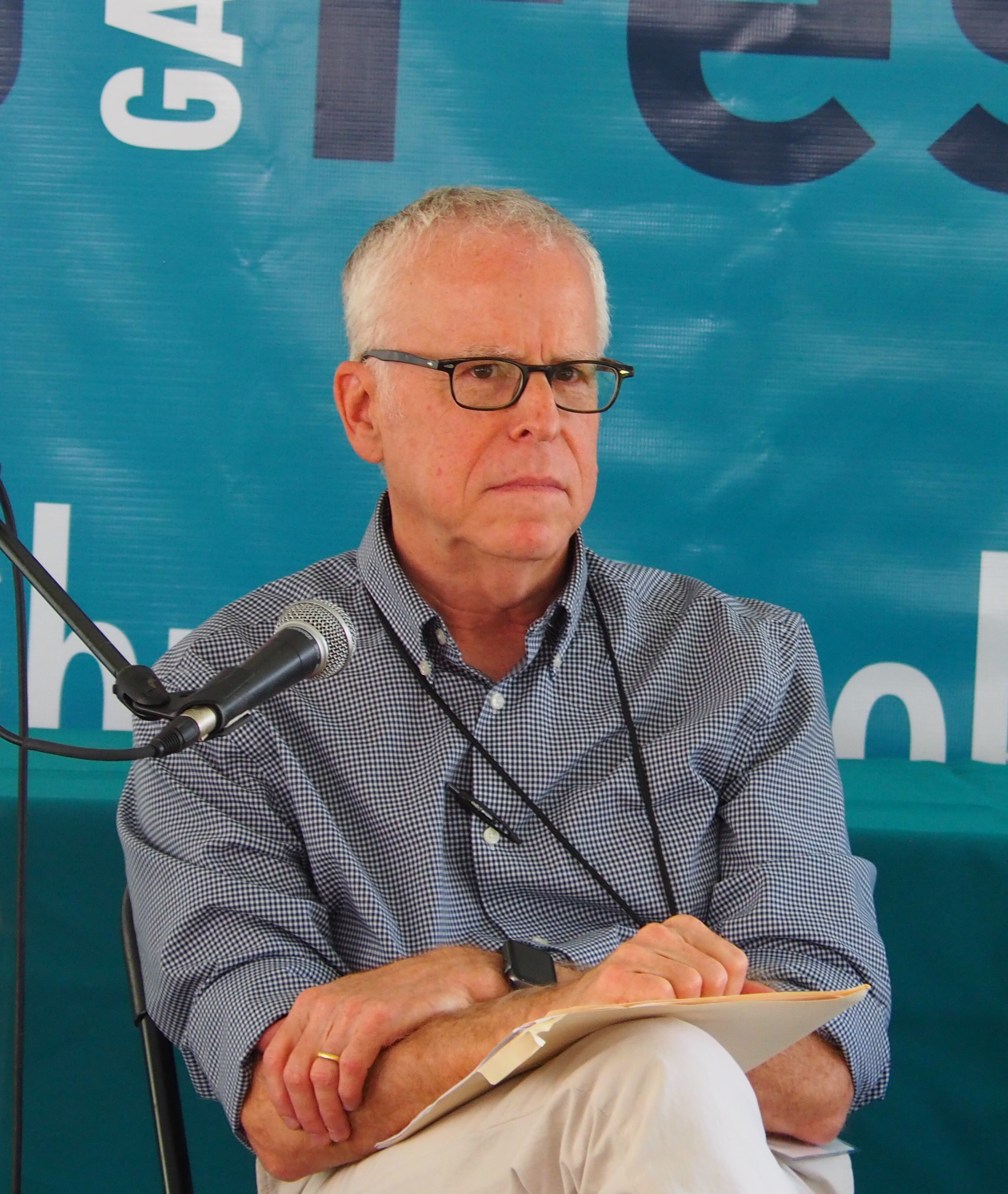
- Occupations: Author, journalist
- Known for: Co-authoring, with Bill Kovach, The Elements of Journalism

Tom Rosenstiel is an American author, journalist, press critic, researcher and academic. He is the Eleanor Merrill Scholar on the Future of Journalism and a Professor of the Practice at the Philip Merrill College of Journalism at the University of Maryland. He is also a senior fellow at NORC at the University of Chicago. Before joining the faculty at Maryland, he was for nine years the executive director of the American Press Institute, and for 16 years directed media research for the Pew Research Center. Rosenstiel is the author of 12 books of fiction and nonfiction.

== Education and career ==
A graduate of Oberlin College and the Columbia School of Journalism, Rosenstiel began his career as a reporter for muckraking political columnist Jack Anderson. He worked at the Peninsula Times Tribune, his hometown paper in Palo Alto, CA, as a business reporter and business editor from 1980 to 1983. He then spent 12 years at the Los Angeles Times, most of those as a media critic and Washington correspondent. He left the Times in 1995 to join Newsweek Magazine. There he served as chief congressional correspondent and covered the Gingrich revolution.

In 1997, he founded the Project for Excellence in Journalism, an institute that studied press performance. In 2006, PEJ became one of the five founding initiatives of the Pew Research Center, where Rosenstiel continued to direct the center's media research through 2012.

Rosenstiel also co-founded the Committee of Concerned Journalists, an organization of journalists around the world working in different media concerned about the future of public interest journalism. Rosenstiel directed CCJ's daily activities until 2006. During those years, Rosenstiel was co-author of CCJ's "Traveling Curriculum," a mid-career education program that trained more than 6,000 U.S. journalists.

In January 2013, Rosenstiel became executive director of the American Press Institute, which was founded in 1946 to train newspaper professionals.

In August 2021, Rosenstiel joined the faculty of the Philip Merrill College of Journalism at the University of Maryland as the Eleanor Merrill Scholar on the Future of Journalism and a Professor of the Practice.

== Works ==
External videos
- Booknotes interview with Rosenstiel on Strange Bedfellows, August 8, 1993, C-SPAN
- Panel discussion with Rosensteil and Kovach on The Elements of Journalism, June 21, 2001, C-SPAN

In 2001, Rosenstiel co-authored with Bill Kovach the book The Elements of Journalism, which identifies, explains and traces intellectual origins of the core principles of American journalism and their role in civil society. Updated in 2007, in 2013 and again in 2021, Elements has been called "one of five essential books on journalism (Roger Mudd, The Wall Street Journal), a "modern classic" (William Safire, The New York Times) and "the most important book on the relationship of journalism and democracy published in the last 50 years" (Roy Clark, Poynter Institute). Elements is the winner of the Goldsmith Book Prize from Harvard University, the Society of Professional Journalists Sigma Delta Chi Award for research in journalism and the Bart Richards Award for Media Criticism from Pennsylvania State University.

Among his other books on journalism are Blur: How to Know What's True in the Age of Information Overload (2011), also with Kovach, which offers a roadmap for how consumers can determine whether the news they encounter is reliable and an outline for how journalism must change to meet the changing needs of the 21st-century citizen; and The New Ethics of Journalism: Principles for the 21st Century, co-edited with Kelly McBride of the Poynter Institute (Sage, 2013).

In February 2017, he published his first novel, Shining City, about a Supreme Court nomination battle. His second novel The Good Lie was published in February 2019. His third novel entitled Oppo was published in December 2019, about the campaign for the presidency. His fourth novel, 'The Days To Come' was published in November 2021. All four novels feature the political fixers Peter Rena and Randi Brooks.

He is also the author of The Next Journalism: How the Press Must Change to Serve Democracy, published in August 2026. The book examines how journalism must evolve to address technological disruption and better serve democratic society.

== Selected publications ==
=== Novels ===
- Rosenstiel, Tom (2017) Shining City: A Novel (Ecco HarperCollins)
- Rosenstiel, Tom (2019) The Good Lie: A Novel (Ecco HarperCollins)
- Rosenstiel, Tom (2019) Oppo: A Novel (Ecco HarperCollins)
- Rosenstiel, Tom (2021) The Days To Come: A Novel (Ecco HarperCollins)

=== Books on journalism ===
- Rosenstiel, Tom (1993). Strange Bedfellows: How TV and the Presidential Candidates Changes American Politics, 1992 (Hyperion Press)
- Rosenstiel, Tom and Bill Kovach (1999). Warp Speed: America in The Age of Mixed Media (Century Foundation).
- Rosenstiel, Tom and Bill Kovach (2001; 2nd edition 2007 3rd edition 2013, 4th edition 2021). The Elements of Journalism: What Newspeople Should Know and the Public Should Expect (Crown Publishing).
- Rosenstiel, Tom and Amy S. Mitchell, editors (2003). Thinking Clearly: Cases in Journalistic Decision Making (Columbia University Press).
- Rosenstiel, Tom and Marion Just, Todd Belt, Atiba Pertilla, Walter Dean and Dante Chinni (2007), We Interrupt This Newscast: How to Improve Local TV and Win Ratings, Too (Cambridge University Press)
- Rosenstiel, Tom and Bill Kovach (2011), Blur: How to Know What's True in the Age of Information Overload (Bloomsbury). ISBN 978-1608193011
- Rosenstiel, Tom and Kelly McBride, editors (2013), The New Ethics of Journalism: Principles for the 21st Century (Sage).
- Rosenstiel, Tom (2026). The Next Journalism: How the Press Must Change to Serve Democracy (Crown).
