= William A. Hilliard =

American journalist (1927–2017)

- Born: William Arthur Hilliard; May 28, 1927; Chicago, Illinois, U.S.
- Died: January 16, 2017 (aged 89); Portland, Oregon, U.S.
- Education: Benson Polytechnic High School; Pacific University
- Occupations: Editor, writer, journalist

William Arthur Hilliard (May 28, 1927 – January 16, 2017) was an American journalist. He was editor of The Oregonian, the major daily newspaper in Portland, Oregon, from 1987 to 1994 and was that newspaper's first African-American editor. He was also president of the American Society of Newspaper Editors in 1993–94.

== Early life and education ==
Hilliard was born on May 28, 1927, in Chicago, but lived in Arkansas until age 8, then moving to Portland, Oregon. As a youth, he applied for a job as a newspaper delivery boy for The Oregonian, but his application was rejected out of concerns that having a black delivery boy would not be acceptable to the paper's white subscribers. He graduated from Benson Polytechnic High School, where he had worked on the school newspaper, and spent a year in the U.S. Navy after being drafted at the end of the Second World War.

Hilliard studied journalism at Vanport College (now Portland State University) and then the University of Oregon, before transferring in 1950 to Pacific University, in Forest Grove, from which he graduated in 1952 with a degree in journalism. While at Pacific, he was managing editor of the university's then-weekly newspaper, The Pacific Index, starting in December 1950, and was the paper's elected editor for the 1951–52 school year.

== Career ==
After leaving Pacific University, Hilliard started the Portland Challenger, a weekly publication targeted at the local black population. He was publisher and editor until it ceased publication a year and a half later. He took a job as a copy boy at The Oregonian with the hope of eventually becoming a general assignment reporter.

Hilliard worked at The Oregonian from 1952 to 1994, starting as a copy boy, and then rising to clerk, sports reporter, religion and general assignment reporter, and in 1965 assistant city editor. In 1971, he became city editor, and in 1982 was named executive editor. He oversaw the merging of the paper with the Oregon Journal in 1982. His first big story was the Holt Korean Babylift in 1956. When he was named city editor it was considered national news, warranting an article in Time Magazine. In 1980 he served as one of four panelists in the nationally televised debates between President Jimmy Carter and Ronald Reagan.

In 1987, Hilliard was named editor of The Oregonian, with "full control over the newspaper's news and editorial departments." He was the newspaper's first African-American editor. He introduced zoned suburban coverage and expanded coverage of minorities issues, as well as increasing the hiring of minorities by the paper. While he was editor two staffers complained to him about how the nicknames of sports teams were demeaning to Native Americans. Under Hilliard's leadership The Oregonian stopped using demeaning sports nicknames in 1992, and the newspaper also stopped identifying people by race in crime stories unless absolutely necessary.

Hilliard served as president of the American Society of Newspaper Editors (ASNE) in 1993–94, the first African-American to be elected to that position. In 1993, he was given the President's Award of the National Association of Black Journalists, which called him a role model. He remained editor of The Oregonian until retiring in 1994, although during the last year of his tenure with the paper he gave his designated successor, executive editor Sandra M. Rowe, effective control of the editor's duties and focused his attention on ASNE duties.

In 1998, Hilliard was given the Oregon Newspaper Hall of Fame Award by the Oregon Newspaper Publishers Association.

In 2002, when it was discovered that USA Today reporter Jack Kelley had fabricated some of his stories, USA Today turned to Hilliard, along with veteran editors John Seigenthaler Sr. and Bill Kovach, to monitor the investigation.

== Death ==
Hilliard died on January 16, 2017, in Portland, of congestive heart failure, at the age of 89.
