= Reactions to the Deepwater Horizon oil spill =

Reactions to the Deepwater Horizon oil spill from various officials and interested parties ranged from blame and outrage at the damage caused by the spill, to calls for greater accountability on the part of the U.S. government and BP, including new legislation dealing with preventative security and clean-up improvements.

== US government ==
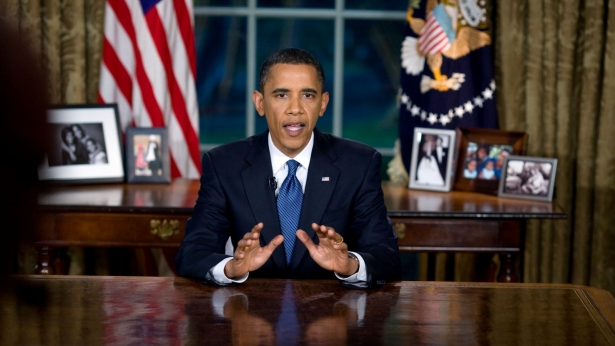
President Obama speaking in the Oval Office about the spill

On 30 April 2010, President Barack Obama ordered the federal government to delay issuing new offshore drilling leases until a thorough review determined whether more safety systems were needed and authorized teams to investigate 29 oil rigs in the Gulf in an effort to determine the cause of the disaster. That same day he announced that he had dispatched the Secretaries of the Department of Interior and Homeland Security, as well as the EPA Administrator and NOAA to the Gulf Coast to assess the disaster.

On 11 May Department of the Interior released a press release, announcing that the inspection of deepwater drilling rigs in the Gulf of Mexico found no major violations. On 30 May, U.S. Secretary of the Interior Ken Salazar issued a moratorium on all deepwater offshore drilling on the Outer Continental Shelf for a period of six months (see 2010 U.S. Deepwater Drilling Moratorium). Soon after, Hornbeck Offshore Services, a company with financial interests in deepwater drilling, filed suit (Hornbeck Offshore Services LLC v. Salazar) in U.S. District Court seeking an injunction to bar enforcement. Judge Martin Feldman of the U.S. District Court in the Eastern District of Louisiana issued a decision for Hornbeck on 22 June 2010, granting a preliminary injunction, barring enforcement of the order. The White House has indicated that they will immediately appeal the injunction. Salazar has indicated that the Department of the Interior will also "issue a new order in the coming days that eliminates any doubt that a moratorium is needed, appropriate, and within our authorities."

On 9 June the FAA issued a NOTAM (Notice to airmen) no-fly zone over the Gulf of Mexico oil spill and the affected area, effective until further notice. According to the New York Times, the Department of Homeland Security is denying media access to the area.

The Obama administration sent a $69 million bill to BP for the U.S. government's clean up effort. The bill was also sent to Transocean, Anadarko, Moex Offshore and QBE Underwriting.

The Obama administration has been noted for its unusually aggressive and often excessive rhetoric in criticizing BP, which some investors saw as an attempt to deflect criticism of his own handling of the crisis. A White House spokesman said the President's job was to keep his "boot on the throat" of the company, a similar phrase used by Interior Secretary Ken Salazar back on 2 May. Republicans such as Rand Paul and Joe Barton have accused President Obama of being anti-business and "un-American", with Paul stating that said he had "heard nothing from BP indicating it wouldn't pay for the spill". British pension fund managers (who have large holdings of BP shares and rely upon its dividends) accepted that while BP had pay compensation for the oil spill and the environmental damage, they argued that the cost to the company's market value from the President Obama's criticism was far outweighing the direct clean-up costs. The Department of State stated that the issue will not affect US-UK relationships, calling the UK its "closest ally".

On 15 June President Obama made his first speech from the Oval Office, addressing the BP oil spill crisis, saying, "This oil spill is the worst environmental disaster America has ever faced... Make no mistake: we will fight this spill with everything we've got for as long as it takes. We will make BP pay for the damage their company has caused. And we will do whatever's necessary to help the Gulf Coast and its people recover from this tragedy." The President was later reported to have said that "his frustration over the mammoth oil spill in the Gulf of Mexico is not an attack on Britain" and that he had "no interest in undermining BP's value", as the two leaders tried to soothe trans-Atlantic tensions over the disaster.

On 4 July 2010, the federal government announced that it will be taking control of the Deepwater Horizon Response website from joint BP/government agency control and would take charge of information posted. BP did not comment on the change. The new site, RestoreTheGulf.gov, was activated on 7 July and will gradually incorporate content previously on deepwaterhorizonresponse.com, to be phased out over several weeks.

== UK government ==
UK Prime Minister David Cameron stated that "sensible dialog" was needed and BP would require certainty over its liability for compensation.

Boris Johnson, the mayor of London, was also reported to have made a similar comment, and similar concerns related to the tenor of media releases were also expressed by Labour MP and ex-Parliamentary Secretary Tom Watson, Vince Cable the Business Secretary, and the UK Foreign Office.

== International governments ==
Three days after the oil spill began, the Netherlands offered to donate the use of ships equipped to handle very large scale spills.

The Netherlands also offered to prepare a contingency plan to protect Louisiana marshlands with sand barriers and a Dutch research institute developed a strategy to begin building 60-mile-long (97 km) dikes within three weeks. According to Geert Visser, Dutch Consul-General, the U.S. government responded to the Dutch offer with "Thanks for your help, but at the moment we can manage ourselves", despite BP's desire to bring in the Dutch equipment. US regulations require that oil-contaminated water must be stored on board in US waters. The Dutch vessels continuously extract the majority of the oil, but the water that returns to the ocean does not comply with the U.S. standard. Dutch officials have criticized the requirement, as it requires many additional trips to on-shore storage facilities. Spill Response Group head Wierd Koops said, "you have to get as much oil as possible into the storage tanks and as little water as possible. So we pump the water, which contains drops of oil, back overboard". Allen explained on 11 June, "We have skimmed, to date, about 18 million gallons of oily water – the oil has to be decanted from that [and] our yield is usually somewhere around 10% or 15% on that". The US later relaxed its requirements and took the Dutch up on part of their offer, airlifting Dutch equipment to the Gulf and retrofitting it to U.S. vessels, where as of 10 June, it had not yet entered service. To avoid using Dutch ships and workers, the U.S. government asked them to train American workers to build the sand berms. According to Floris Van Hovell, a Dutch spokesman, Dutch dredging ships could complete the Louisiana berms twice as fast as the U.S. companies.

As of 6 May, the United Nations and 14 countries had offered assistance. The U.S. government declined the offers, with a State Department email to reporters stating "there is no need right now that the U.S. cannot meet." The countries offering help were Canada, Croatia, France, Germany, Iran, Ireland, Mexico, the Netherlands, Norway, Romania, South Korea, Spain, Sweden, and the United Kingdom. On 21 June, Iran's Revolutionary Guards offered assistance to contain the oil spill.

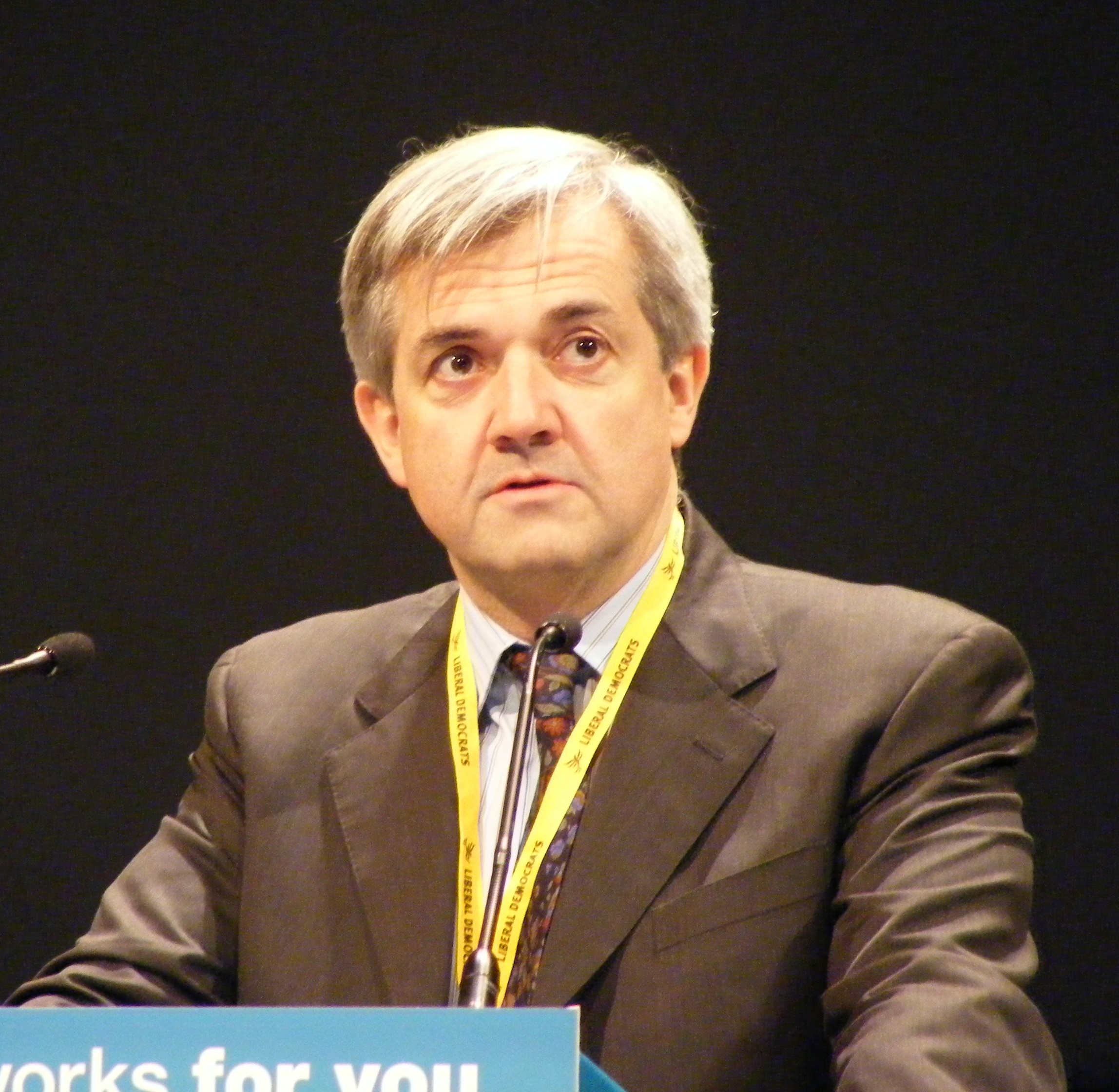
Chris Huhne, the UK Secretary of State for the Department of Energy and Climate Change

On 14 June Chris Huhne, the then UK Secretary of State for the Department of Energy and Climate Change, made a formal statement to the House of Commons, expressing sympathy to those affected, that the environmental consequences must take priority and that the UK Government would remain focused on practical measures to achieve this, including offering dispersants.

That same day, U.S. spokesman P.J. Crowley said the U.S. had received 21 aid offers from 17 countries and four international groups. "We are maintaining contact with these countries, we are grateful for the offers, and we will take them up on these offers." On 19 June, the Coast Guard actively requested skimming boats and equipment from the Netherlands, Norway, France, and Spain. By 25 June, the U.S. State Department listed 70 assistance offers from 23 countries, and indicated that 8 had been accepted. On 29 June the State Department accepted 22 offers of assistance from 12 countries and international bodies, including two high speed skimmers and fire containment boom from Japan.

A month after the French foreign minister volunteered a fleet of private oil-skimming boats, the owner met with BP and Coast Guard officials to present the idea. Weeks later, in late June 2010, a private contractor in Florida purchased 9 of them.

The U.S. Jones Act prohibits the use of foreign ships and foreign crews in port-to-port shipping and within the three-mile limit. Initially, foreign-flagged boats stayed outside the limit and did not transport oil, exempting them from the Act. Allen states, "While we have not seen any need to waive the Jones Act as part of this historic response, we continue to prepare for all possible scenarios....Should any waivers be needed, we are prepared to process them as quickly as possible to allow vital spill response activities being undertaken by foreign-flagged vessels to continue without delay." According to the spill response center, six vessels have now applied for waivers. As of late June, none had been granted.

== Industry ==
Jack Gerard, President of The American Petroleum Institute (API), stated that disasters are infrequent and that the Deepwater Horizon is an isolated incident. By touting the aggregate safety record of the industry API has refuted any claims of a loss of industry wide credibility. API has also stated that the offshore drilling industry is important to job creation and economic growth To help prevent a recurrence of the Deepwater Horizon spill, API is setting up its own offshore safety institute that will be separate from API's lobbying organization.

During congressional testimony, key API stakeholders such as Chevron's CEO John Watson, made an open admission to the industry's credibility gap stating "For our industry, this is a humbling experience. The American people expect that the energy we need will be produced safely and reliably. That did not happen here". Furthermore, ExxonMobil's CEO Rex Tillerson, testified that, "When these things happen, we are not well equipped to deal with them". Additionally, ExxonMobil, Chevron, ConocoPhillips and Shell have made plans to fund a billion dollar joint venture to build a new rapid response capability for deep water offshore drilling response in the Gulf of Mexico. While all of the top five oil CEOs seem to be in unanimous agreement on the issue of expediting the permitting process, at least publicly. they all agreed that industry needs to work harder at improving safety so that events like Deepwater Horizon do not occur in the future and that a more robust capacity to deal with them when they do is established.

Insurance Times reported an open letter from the Chairman of RSA Insurance Group, "the head of one of the country's leading companies", to President Obama (text of letter) that expressed a concern over "double standards" compared to the 2008 financial crisis and over "prejudicial and personal" comments in the media.

== BP public relations ==
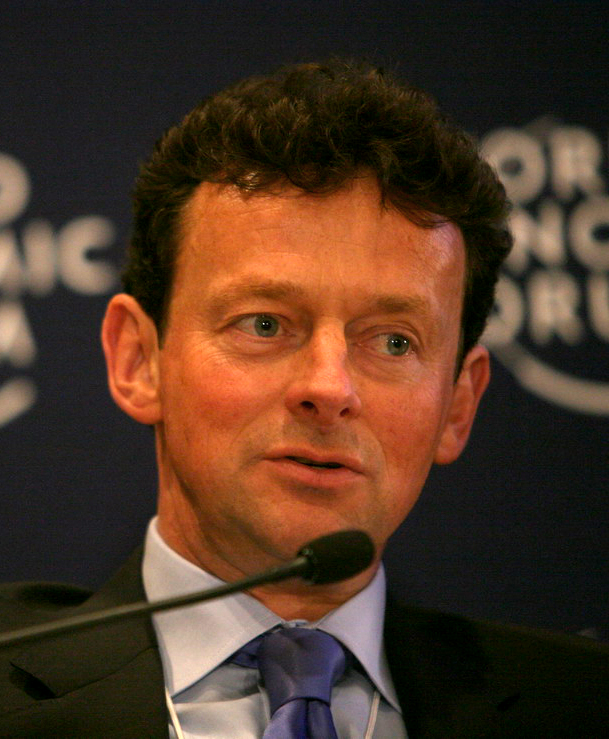
Tony Hayward of BP

Initially BP downplayed the incident; CEO Tony Hayward called the amount of oil and dispersant "relatively tiny" in comparison with the "very big ocean." Hayward also initially stated that the environmental effect of the Gulf spill would likely be "very very modest." Later, he said that the spill was a disruption to Gulf Coast residents and himself adding, "You know, I'd like my life back." He later apologized for his statements. BP's chief operating officer Doug Suttles contradicted the underwater plume discussion noting, "It may be down to how you define what a plume is here… The oil that has been found is in very minute quantities." On 16 June BP chairman Carl-Henric Svanberg, speaking to reporters after meeting with President Obama at the White House said, "I hear comments sometimes that large oil companies are greedy companies who don't care. But that is not the case in BP. We care about the small people."

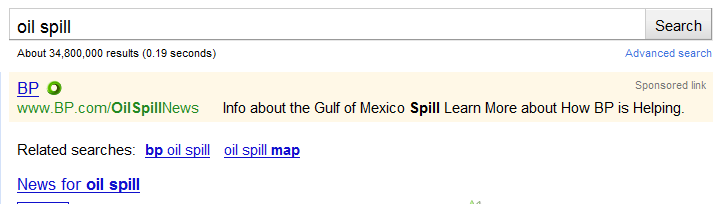
Google search result for "oil spill" showing sponsored link by BP, followed by link to news for oil spill

On 30 May BP hired Anne Kolton, former head of public affairs at the U.S. Department of Energy and former spokesperson for Dick Cheney, as head of U.S. media relations. BP established a new division, headed by board member and managing director Bob Dudley to handle the company's response. On 4 June BP began running TV ads featuring CEO Tony Hayward as he apologized for the disaster, adding "We will make this right." The company also ran print ads in newspapers including The New York Times, The Wall Street Journal, USA Today and The Washington Post. According to Jon Bond, co-founder of agency Kirshenbaum Bond Senecal + Partners, the cost for the BP public relations campaign was about $50 million. BP spokesperson Toby Odone told ABC News that BP had successfully bid for several search terms related to the oil spill on Google and other search engines so that the first sponsored search result links directly to the company's website. This is "a great PR strategy" commented Kevin Ryan, CEO of an internet communications firm, and one not used before by other firms facing similar public relations "nightmares," adding that research suggests most people cannot distinguish between sponsored links and actual news sites.

On 26 July 2010, The Guardian announced that CEO Tony Hayward was to quit. The move was reported as being an attempt by BP to rebuild their shattered image in the United States. Haywards leaving package is expected to be under basic contractual terms. That means one-year's pay of £1m and a pension pot of more than £10m, capable of paying out more than £500,000 a year when Hayward reaches 60. He will be replaced by the Gulf Spill clean up chief Bob Dudley, who is an American citizen and previously worked for Amoco.

== Public reaction ==
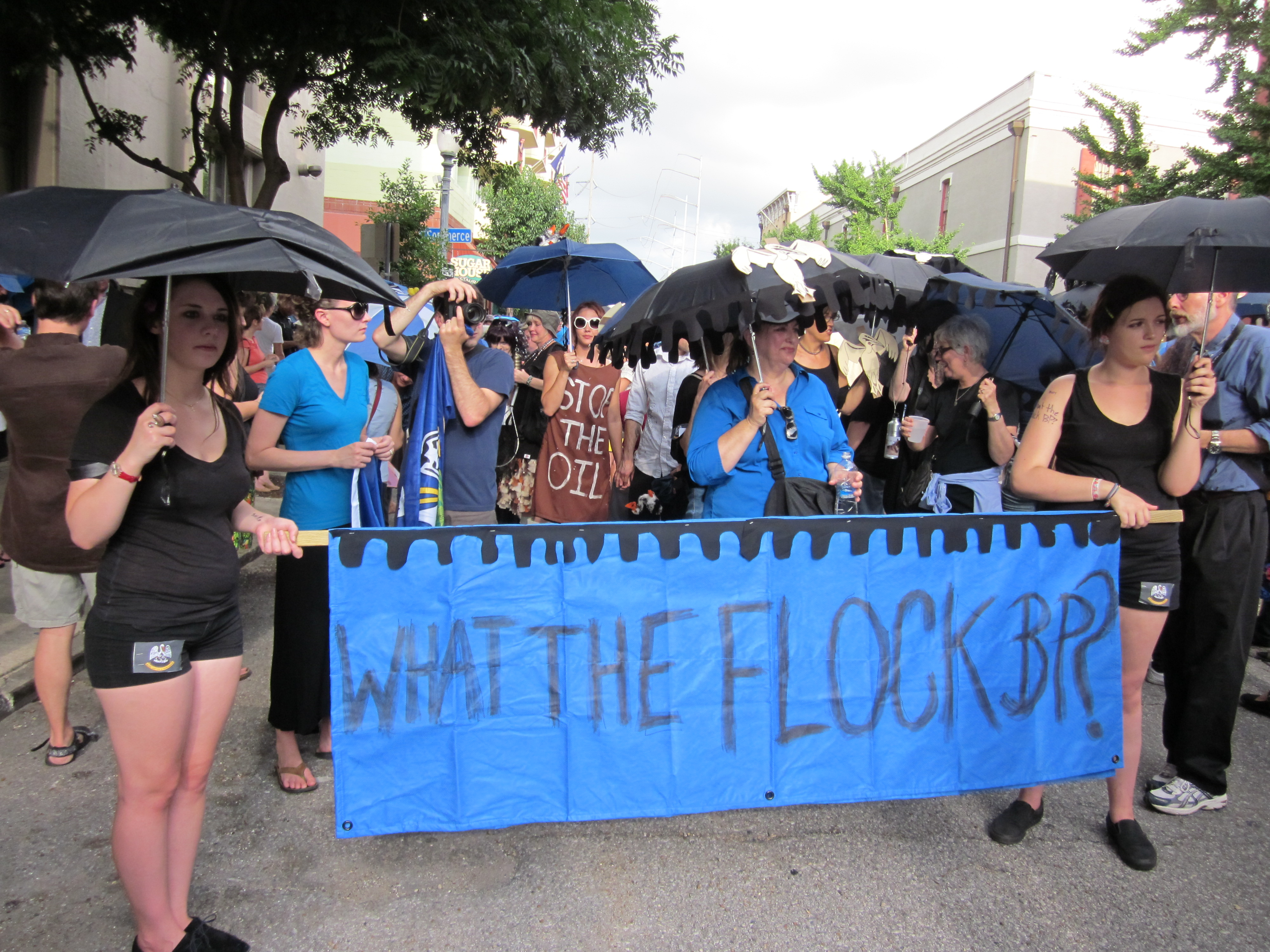
Public protest in New Orleans following the oil spill

There has been a great deal of criticism of BP both in the US and worldwide for its role in the oil spill. By 22 June, the Facebook page "Boycott BP," started by Lee Perkins, had over 688,500 "likes" from Facebook users, and generated media stories. By 3 July, the online petition "Boycott BP" posted by consumer advocacy group Public Citizen had over 22,000 pledges from people who pledge not to buy any BP products for three months. Across the US, thousands of people participated in dozens of protests at BP gas stations and other locations. Alternative metal band Korn is boycotting the use of BP fuel in their tour bus for all upcoming tour dates, and also encouraged other bands to do the same. Korn eventually got the entire 2010 Mayhem Festival to join the boycott, and several other recording artists including Lady Gaga, Creed, Disturbed and Rise Against, among others. In late May, Greenpeace activists in London scaled BP's company headquarters in St. James's Square and unfurled mock BP logo banners imprinted with oil stains reading "british polluters". According to the Associated Press, as of 29 June the protests caused sales declines at some stations between 10% and 40%, but BP owns few of the 11,000 U.S. stations selling its fuel under the BP, Amoco and ARCO banners. Most are owned locally, under contract to buy BP fuel.

The Deepwater Horizon oil spill inspired new protests against all off-shore oil drilling, including the Greenpeace protest where activists painted "No Arctic Drilling" with spilled BP oil on the side of a ship in the Gulf en route to drill in the Arctic. At the protest, Phil Radford of Greenpeace called for "President Obama [to] ban all offshore oil drilling and call for an end to the use of oil in our cars by 2030."

The Organization for International Investment, a Washington-based advocate for overseas investment into the U.S., warned in early July that the political rhetoric surrounding the disaster is potentially damaging the reputation of all British companies with operations in the U.S. and sparked a wave of U.S. protectionism that has restricted British firms from winning government contracts, making political donations and lobbying.

=== Public opinion ===
Regarding the handling of the situation, according to a USA Today-Gallup poll conducted in late May, 53 percent of Americans rated Obama's performance as poor or very poor, while 43 percent rated it as good or very good. Approximately 60 percent said the federal government had done a poor or very poor job, while 35 percent rated the government's performance as good or very good. A CBS News poll also conducted in late May likewise found a negative evaluation of Obama, with 45 percent disapproving of his performance, 35 percent approving, and 20 percent undecided. 73 percent in the Gallup poll describing BP's response as poor or very poor, while 24 percent said it had been good or very good. In the CBS survey, 70 percent disapproved of BP's response, with only 18 percent approving and 12 percent undecided. An opinion poll conducted by Washington Post-ABC News in early June found that nearly three-quarters of Americans considered the spill a major environmental disaster. Of those polled, 81 percent viewed the BP response negatively and 69 percent viewed the federal government response negatively. Sixty-four percent of those polled expressed support for criminal prosecution of BP.

== News media ==
An editorial in USA Today was critical of BP, saying that the explosion "was likely the result of corner-cutting and risk-taking ingrained in BP's culture." The editorial also criticized the accuracy and tone of comments made by BP executives.

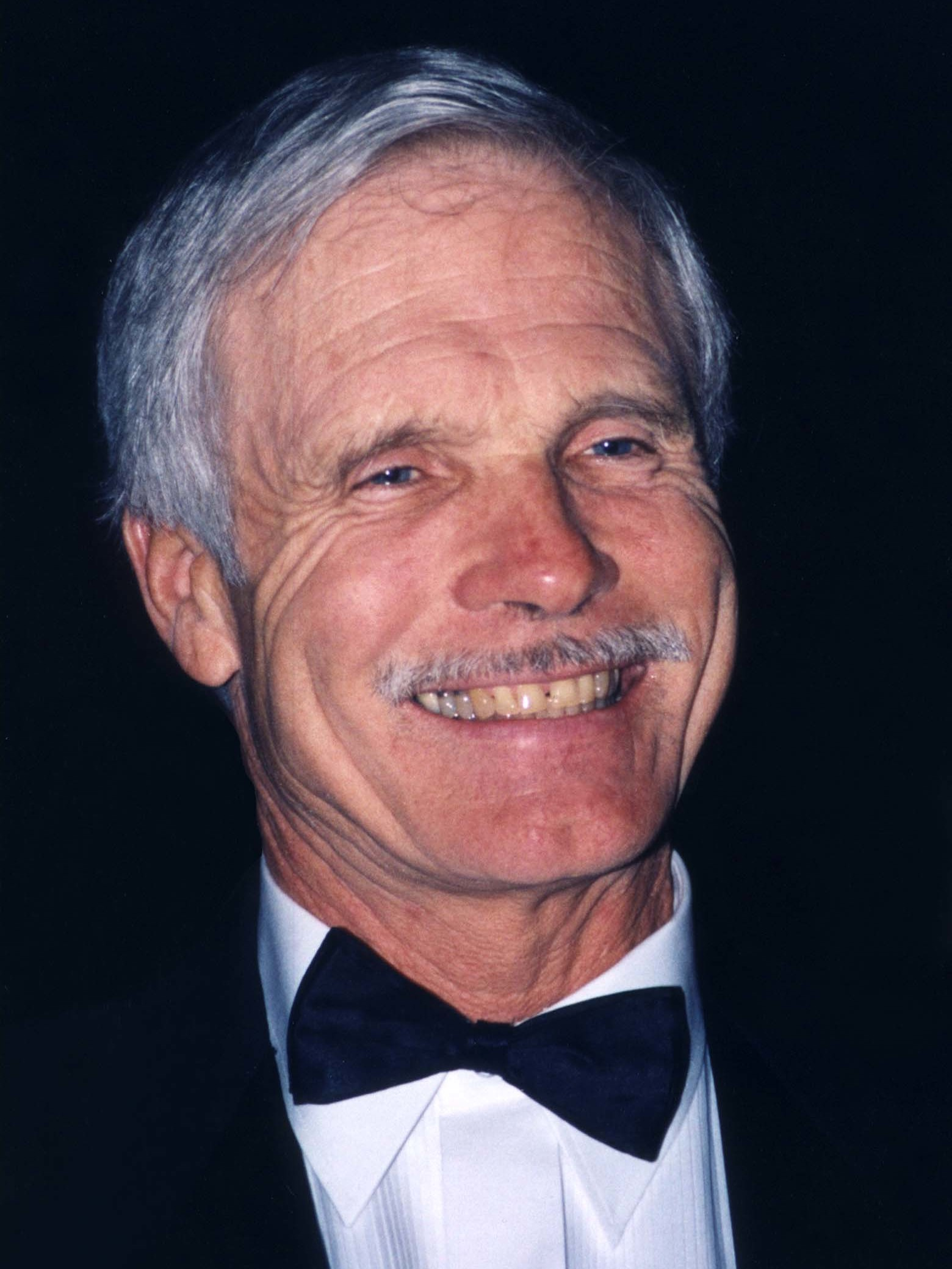
Ted Turner

Ted Turner commented on CNN about the spill along with the West Virginia Upper Big Branch Mine disaster on 5 April, stating that God might be using those incidents to send a message about offshore drilling and coal mining. "I think maybe we ought to just leave the coal in the ground and go with solar and wind power and geothermals," he said.

Matthew Lynn, a columnist at Bloomberg, wrote that America's anger towards BP for the oil spill is based on a double standard because, he says, America's high consumption of oil leads companies to drill in dangerous places. He specifically criticized the United States for its low gas taxes and lack of climate change regulations. Lynn also criticized BP's response to the spill, saying that BP should sell its U.S. assets to another company because Hayward's job is to serve the stockholders, "not make yourself acceptable to a country that doesn't want you anymore." Jon Snow, at Channel 4 in the United Kingdom, drew parallels between the current oil spill, whose initial explosion killed 11 people immediately, and the Union Carbide accident in India, which killed at least 3,000 people immediately. Snow said that Obama "is now at war" with BP, while America has taken no action on an arrest warrant issued for Warren Anderson, the former Union Carbide chief executive. Al Jazeera's Abid Ali asked "Is BP bashing getting out of hand?" in regards to new calls from US legislators over BP's alleged involvement in the release of Abdelbaset al-Megrahi from Scotland to Libya. Al Jazeera also suggested Obama should urge US companies to cough up for their environmental disasters globally, starting with Chevron, which is on the hook for $27 billion, for dumping 56 billion litres of toxic waste in the Ecuadorian Amazon rainforest; Chevron claims it's done its bit and the rest is up Petro Ecuador.

In the UK, there was anger at the American press and news outlets for the misuse of the term "British Petroleum" for the company – a name which has not been used since British Petroleum merged with the American company, Amoco, in 1998 to form BP. This was said to be 'dumping' the blame onto the British people and there was calls for British Prime Minister David Cameron to protect British interests in America.

=== Media framing of the BP spill ===
Ongoing research focuses on how media framing of the BP spill has affected public opinion. Framing theory explains how organizations, media, politicians, and businesses articulate their causes and advocate issues to their publics. It is based on the assumption that how an issue is characterized can have an influence on how it is understood by audiences (Scheufele & Tewksbury, 2006).

The news media spent considerable time reporting on the incident as it unfolded. The story posed certain challenges as it was complicated, technical, long-running and did not break down along predictable political and ideological lines. A Pew Research Center study finds that the story dominated mainstream news media for 100 days after the explosion, accounting for 22% of the "news hole." The media played a huge role in public opinion and concern for this environmental disaster. Research has shown that the way in which major news events are portrayed by the media influences how the public perceives them and how much importance is placed on the issues. News coverage generated a lot of public interest in the incident and framed responsibility for the accident in several ways. Since the first news break, BP came under fire from many directions, including the federal and state governments, activists and environmental groups. Criticism was focused on the spill's damage as well as the company's record of bypassing safety measures and violating environmental laws. While the Obama administration initially received some of the blame for its response to the accident, critical coverage diminished over time and focused more on the responsibility of BP and its CEO Tony Hayward. The coverage generally broke down along three chronological phases – the first was that BP was responsible for the spill, the second was that the company was working to solve it and would create a fund to compensate those adversely effected, and the third was that BP had successfully capped the well. One study finds the media overwhelming used an "economic consequences frame," focusing on the cost the disaster would have for BP and how the company would make payments to victims.

The media coverage, citing both the scientific comments and President Obama's remarks, initially predicted a significant effect on the region and wildlife. Photographs of injured birds, fish, and plants in the area were widely used in the media coverage of the event, though after the well was capped articles and news pieces changed their tone. They started to ask if the effects hadn't been exaggerated, pointing out that in some ways the damage paled in comparison to the Exxon Valdez spill and approaching the environmental effect with a more measured approach.

Further research explores how players in the disaster portrayed and framed their own perspectives to the public. With an overwhelmingly anti-ecological perspective both Obama and Tony Blair portrayed the incident mainly in social terms, rather than environmental ones, and framed the event within the broader discourse of ecological modernization emphasizing the value of taming nature vs. a more holistic approach.

== Art ==
Michael Boroniec created a collection of pieces titled "Crude Awakening" that includes terra cotta sculptures of birds covered in oil and a silk screened American flag portrayed by motor oil on canvas, during the spill.

On 20 April 2011 – the first anniversary of the explosion —, members of the art activist group Liberate Tate poured a mixture of charcoal and sunflower oil over another member of the group that lay naked and in a fetal position on the floor in the middle of the London Tate Modern exhibition Single Form. The performance lasted 87 minutes, for the spill's 87 days. The exhibition Single Form, dedicated to the body in sculpture from Rodin to Barbara Hepworth, belongs to a series of exhibitions sponsored by BP at Tate (BP British Art Displays).

166 artists, writers, activists and intellectuals — among them Naomi Klein, John Keane and Matthew Herbert — published a letter in the British newspaper The Guardian, on the day of the anniversary, urging the museum "to demonstrate its commitment to a sustainable future by ending its sponsorship relationship with BP".

== Charity ==
More than $4 million has been donated to offset economic and environmental damage. Almost half of that amount has been from oil companies. BP America made a $1 million donation to Second Harvest Food as requests for food assistance have increased as a result of the spill. On 22 June, BP said money received from selling oil from Deepwater Horizon would go to the National Fish and Wildlife Foundation, to be used to help wildlife along the Gulf Coast. BP started the fund with $5 million.

== See also ==
- Gulf Coast Ecosystem Restoration Task Force
