= The Pacific Index =

Student newspaper in Forest Grove, Oregon

The Pacific Index The Index
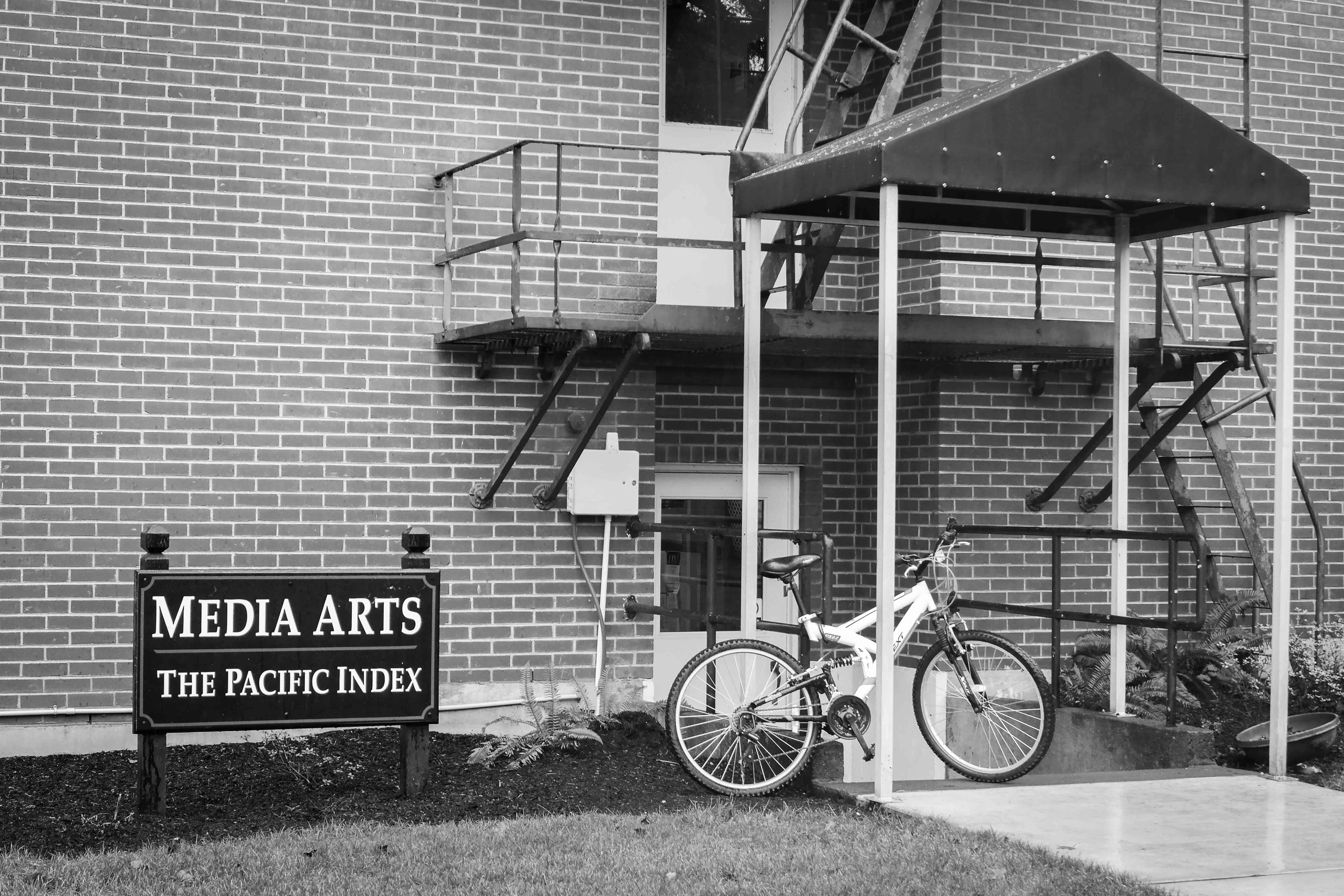
- Type: Student newspaper
- Format: Tabloid
- Owner: Pacific University
- Editor-in-chief: Ella Cutter & Bren Swogger
- Founded: 1893
- Headquarters: Forest Grove, Oregon
- Website: pacindex.com

The Pacific Index is the student-run newspaper of Pacific University in Forest Grove, Oregon, United States. The biweekly paper is a member of the College Publisher Network.

== History ==
Pacific University started a campus newspaper in 1893 as a monthly paper named the Pacific University Index. By 1899, circulation for the 16-page paper had grown to 275, with a subscription costing 50 cents. The paper experimented with a "date bureau" to help students find dates, starting the program in March 1936. In 1939, The Index was selected for a second-class honor rating by the Associated Collegiate Press. Then, for the 1939 to 1940 academic year, The Index went through three editors, with freshman Don Wilson as the third taking over in January 1940.

In 1943, the paper was awarded a first-class honor rating by the Associated Collegiate Press. For the 1951 to 1952 school year, Bill Hilliard was the elected editor of the paper, which was still a weekly publication at that time. In 1965, the newspaper and school yearbook were both put under the direction of the school’s journalism department, the first time that had happened at Pacific. That year, Patricia Stephenson was selected as the editor.

The Index endorsed then U.S. Representative Robert B. Duncan over then-governor Mark Hatfield in the 1966 U.S. Senate Race, which Hatfield went on to win. The newspaper also endorsed Tom McCall for Oregon Secretary of State, and Pacific University later started an annual lecture series named in McCall’s honor. In October 2010, the Index went through a redesign as well as improvements to the associated website. The newspaper was a biweekly publication at that time.

== Details ==
The student newspaper is published biweekly, though stories appear online more frequently. The Index is distributed only on the college’s main campus in Forest Grove and at the school’s Health Professions Campus in Hillsboro, Oregon. In 2020, due to the COVID-19 pandemic, The Pacific Index temporarily stopped production of their print issues, and moved to an online only platform. The Pacific Index Podcast was launched in 2020.
