= Overall clothing boycott movement =

1920 American consumer boycott

Overall boycott movement
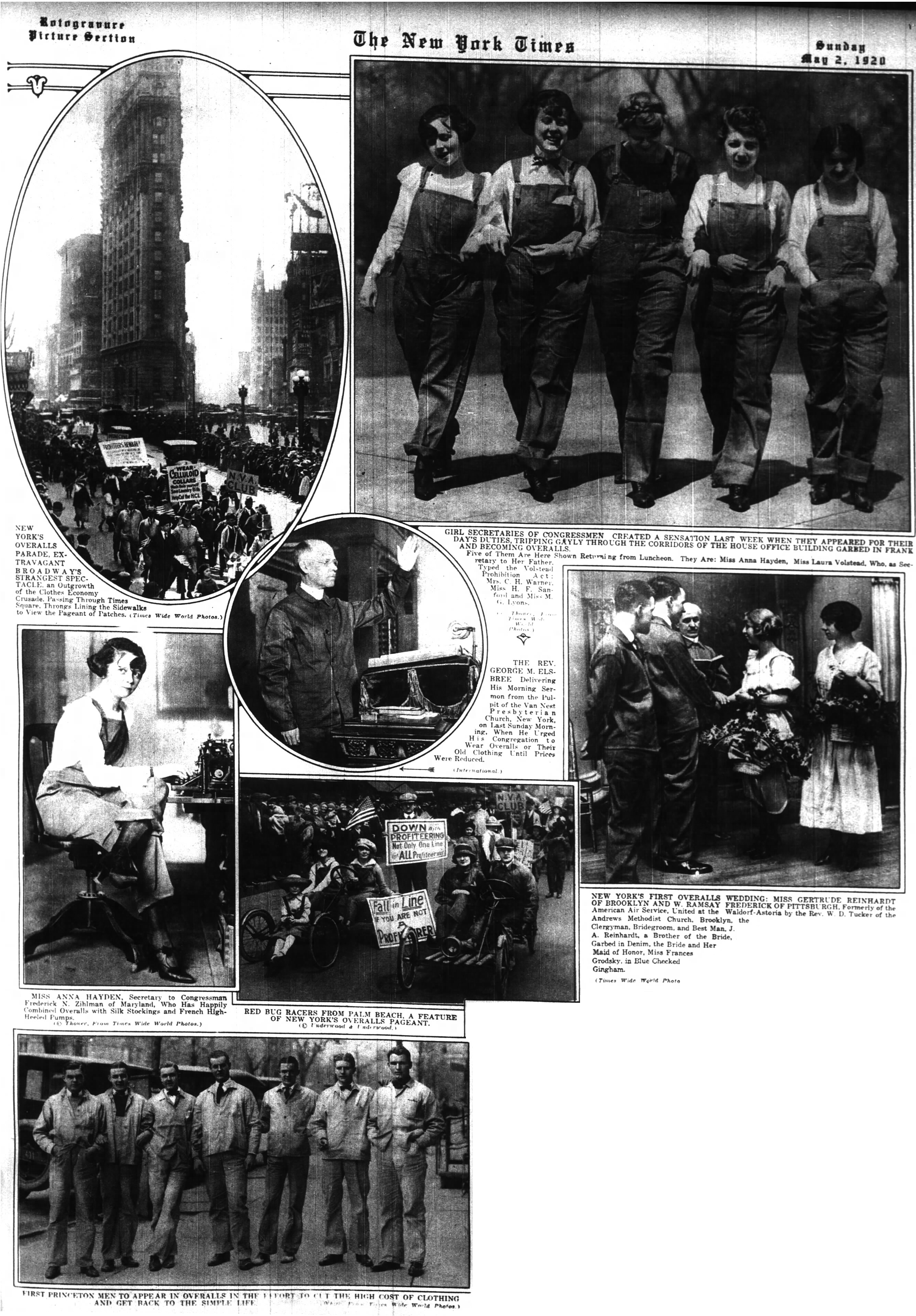
- The New York Times; May 2, 1920
- Date: March 1920 - June 1920
- Caused by: Clothing un-affordability; Cost of living crisis
- Goals: Reduction in clothing prices
- Methods: Boycotts

Lead figures
Noel A. Mitchell	

The overall movement was a United States consumer boycott movement in 1920 against the high cost of clothing. Clothing consumer costs had significantly increased following WW1. In response people across the US formed 'overall clubs' pledging to only wear overalls until the costs of clothing went down, holding parades to bring attention to the issue and calling the government to intervene on the crisis. Ultimately the movement is considered largely unsuccessful in its objectives due to several internal divisions among race, gender and class. However some members of the movement would later become organizers of other group actions.

== Background ==
Prior to the start of the overall boycott movement the United States was facing a high cost of living crisis, in part due to the redirection of industries during WW1.

This caused several different actions by the broader 'public' and the government. One such response was the encouragement of at home 'victory gardens' during & after the war to conserve food supplies and in an attempt to force down food prices. Everything from municipal city owned food markets established across the country, on the idea that it would cut out middlemen from adding to the costs; To the adoption of daylights savings, to give workers more daylight after the end of their shift so they can work on their home gardens were adopted in the name of fighting food costs.

Another was the Lever Act of 1917 which was passed to give the Department of Justice legal authority to prosecute food profiteers and hoarders. Further amended on October 22, 1919 to include prosecution against profiteers of wearing apparel.

This would culminate in the DOJ prosecution of the American Woolen Company in May, 1920 for profiteering, with accusations the companies profits amounted to 300-400%. The defense questioned the constitutionality of the Lever act and claimed the act didn't apply to raw cloth since it wasn't wearing apparel as defined in the bill. The judge eventually ruled in favor of the company. A decision that caused significant outrage and led many to lose confidence in the governments ability to address the crisis, planting the seeds of the Overall consumer boycott movement.

== Boycott ==
=== Origin ===
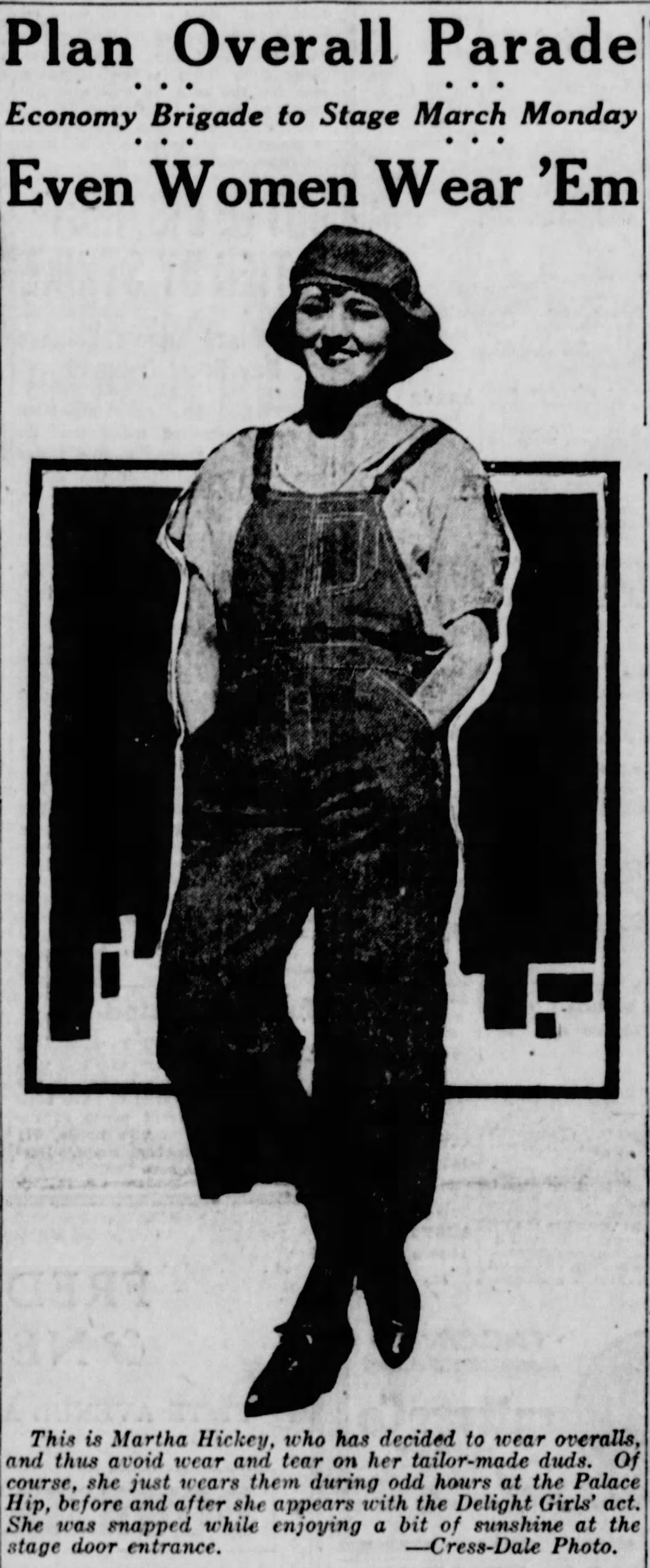
The Seattle Star; April 21, 1920

The overall boycott movement would begin at the end of March, 1920 in Jacksonville, Florida. A group of people in the city decided to meet to discuss and organize a response to the rising price of clothing at local stores, they decided the $2.50 overall would become the symbol of the protest and means. Agreeing to only wear overalls until clothing prices dropped, soon more than a 1,000 members had enrolled in the city's club.

Then for further publicity the group scheduled an overall parade for April 8 which was met with fanfare. The goal of this group was to reach across class bounds to create a broad base movement against the cost of living crisis.

On March 29, the overall movement spread to and was popularized by its growth in Tampa, Fl. From which it shifted and gained an increasingly anti-labor tone, blaming unions for the high cost of labor alongside profiteers. This was due largely due to the presence of 'citizens committees' formed by business owners in Tampa who framed organized labor as the enemy of 'the public'. Within Tampa, these 'citizen committees' used antilabor vigilantism, intimidating and killing labor activists in the city, as a means of protecting the interests of tobacco companies in the city.

This was not by any means unique to Tampa, but instead part of a far broader coordinated attack on labor in the US following the end of WW1 by business, known as the American 'open shop' plan. The plan utilized the cost of living crisis to crush the greater labor organizing power reached during WW1 by placing blame on them. With businesses both coordinating press, and coordinating actions against labor under much broader associations.

In Tampa, on April 4 an Easter day overall demonstration parade was held. At the very end of it, the group presented a petition to Mayor Donald McKay that protested the cost of clothing, high cost of living, and called for government intervention on the matter. It also was at some point presented to Governor Sidney Cats and Florida's two senators at the time. And proclaimed the groups intention to not purchase any more clothing until the issue was addressed.

One notable example of the movement was Mayor of St.Petersburg, Florida Noel A. Mitchell, head of the St.Pete overall's club. Who ordered army surplus overalls for the city public. Using city hall to coordinate the orders and as the location to give out the overalls. In addition he ordered 4,608 pounds of army bacon and 1,800 pounds of canned beef to sell to St.Pete citizens at a third of the typical cost, as a way to address the cost of living crisis which was also effecting food costs.

In terms of government involvement, while government officials would often give lip service to the overall movement, they were largely symbolic, and often used as a means of criticizing and blaming organized labor for the cost crisis by conservative politicians. US Senator Nathaniel Dial for example blamed the high cost of living crisis first on organized labor, second on extravagance, and lastly profiteering. The involvement of politicians went all the way up to the 1920 United States presidential campaign with both Calvin Coolidge and Warren G. Harding endorsing the movement.

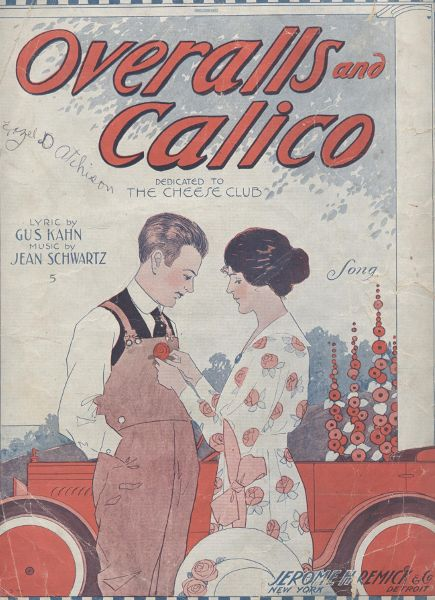
Overalls and Calico, a song dedicated to the NYC Overall parade organizers.

By late April the overall movement had spread nationally in popular culture. Culminating in a parade in New York City on April 24 of several hundred marchers. One sensationalist aspect of the parade was the use of Hippodrome's circus elephants in the march.

=== Decline ===
==== Gender, racial, and class segregation ====
Ultimately several issues existed within the movement that significantly hindered its effectiveness. Chauvinism and an emphasis on overalls being a return to 'traditional' masculinity often excluded or otherwise segregated women from the movement. With them instead told to form Calico and Gingham clubs, with overalls viewed as not feminine enough. This was not all encompassing but was pervasive enough to tamper the movement.

In addition the construction of the movement was largely defined by a self identification with 'middle class' white collar living; With that identity being racialized as well as white exclusive. This excluded large bases of the population from the movement. This framework was in part encouraged by the conservative 'citizens committees' set up around the country by the American 'open shop' plan determined to break apart the power of organized labor in the country.

Alongside the hostility towards organized labor fostered within the movement, the choice of overall's as a symbol of the boycott itself led to natural tensions; The choice had driven up the price of overalls, which blue collar workers needed for their jobs, forcing them to spend up to triple the normal price. On the issue, the socialist New York Call said the following, “The net result of the overalls craze is to increase the cost of living for the workers which will certainly be followed by strikes for more wages and a middle class yowl because of the ‘Red specter’.”

==== 'Old clothes' clubs ====
Among those who participated in the overalls movement, the issue on accidentally raising the price of overalls did not go unnoticed. In response, wanting to minimize the cost burden on others, a new support for 'old clothes clubs' grew, which many members migrated to. However the lack of visibility that wearing old clothes had compared to wearing overalls weakened the visibility of the movement and ability to publicize. By July 1920, both the overall and 'old clothes' clubs had largely disbanded.

== Aftermath ==
It's ultimately unclear how much of an effect that the movement had on the trajectory of clothing prices, especially given the short lived nature of it, but is considered likely minimal at best. However, organizers of the movement would later join other movements, such as John R. Patterson, who would become the leader of the Rogers Park Tenants union during the 1920–1921 Chicago rent strikes.

== In popular culture ==
- Schwartz, Jean; Kahn, Gus (1920). Overalls and Calico: Song. Jerome H. Remick & Co.
- The Gingham Girl
