= 2025 United States boycott =

International consumer movement

The 2025 United States boycott is an international consumer movement that emerged in early 2025, primarily in Canada and Europe, characterized by individuals and businesses deliberately avoiding United States products and services as a form of protest against policies implemented by the Donald Trump administration following his return to the presidency in January 2025.

However, the boycott gained its most significant momentum in early 2025 following implementation of new tariffs on imports from various countries, particularly Canada and the European Union, as well as other controversial foreign policy decisions. The movement has been characterized by grassroots organization through social media platforms, the development of specialized mobile applications to identify American products, and public demonstrations against American companies with close ties to the Trump administration.

== Background ==
President Trump implemented what he called "Liberation Day tariffs" on April 2, 2025, imposing a blanket 10% duty on all imports into the United States. Additional "reciprocal" tariffs of up to 25% were applied to specific countries, including Canada and the European Union. The United States later announced a 90-day pause for most countries and reduced some tariffs back to the 10% base rate, with the exception of China, which continued to face 125% tariffs. These measures prompted retaliatory economic actions from affected countries, including the European Union, which announced tariffs worth $28 billion on American imports.

=== Political tensions ===
Beyond trade disputes, several political controversies contributed to deteriorating international relations:

President Trump's repeat suggestion that Canada should become "America's 51st state" sparked widespread fury among Canadians. Renewed interest in acquiring Greenland, an autonomous territory of the Kingdom of Denmark, angered Danish citizens and government officials. A contentious White House meeting between Trump and Ukrainian President Volodymyr Zelenskyy, described by critics as humiliating for Zelenskyy, fueled European discontent regarding the administration's approach to the Russian invasion of Ukraine. Additionally, the U.S. withdrawal from the Paris Agreement and the WHO among other decisions may also have contributed substantially to the motivations behind the boycott movement. Increased detentions of Canadian and European tourists at the United States border led several countries, including Germany, the United Kingdom, Denmark, Finland, and Portugal, to issue travel warnings for the United States.

== Scope and impact ==
=== Consumer participation ===
The boycott has manifested in various forms across different countries:

==== Canada ====
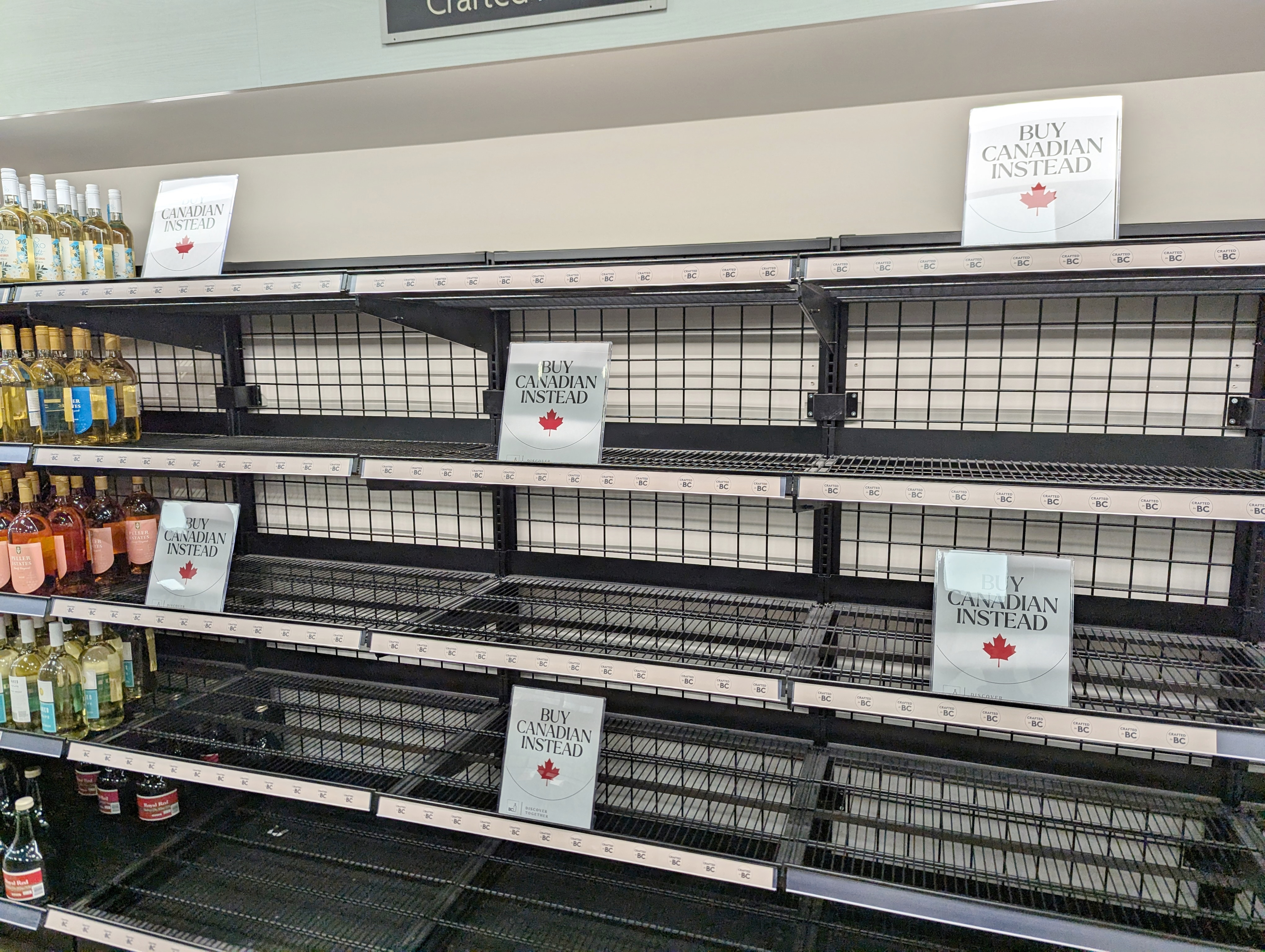
"Buy Canadian Instead" signs on empty shelves at a BC Liquor Store in New Westminster

The hardest hit of any boycotts towards the United States comes from Canada. Border crossings from Canada to the United States decreased by more than 23% in February 2025 compared to the previous year.

Multiple mobile applications were developed to help Canadians identify and avoid United States products, including "Buy Beaver", "Maple Scan", "O SCANada", "Is This Canadian?", and "Check the Label". "Maple Scan" ranked as the fourth highest downloaded app on the iPhone App Store in Canada.

Canadian businesses launched "Buy Canadian" campaigns, with many stores adding labels to highlight domestically produced items.

The Liquor Control Board of Ontario and other provincial authorities announced they would stop stocking American-made alcoholic products. According to a March 2025 report, some Canadian retailers are turning away various U.S. products.

==== Europe ====
In Denmark, approximately 50% of consumers reported deliberately refraining from buying United States products since Trump's inauguration, according to a Megafon survey for TV 2.

Swedish polls indicated that 70% of Swedes had considered or actively participated in boycotting United States products, with 10% having boycotted all USA goods completely.

Facebook groups promoting the boycott gained significant membership: a Swedish group called "Bojkotta varor från USA" (Boycott goods from the USA) attracted around 100,000 members, while a Danish equivalent, "Boykot varer fra USA", amassed over 90,000 members. In France, a group called "BOYCOTT USA: Achetez Français et Européen!" (BOYCOTT USA: Buy French and European!) gathered approximately 30,000 members.

===== Apps and websites =====
Several websites and apps have been made for enabling consumers and organizations avoid U.S. products more easily. On Reddit, the group "r/BuyFromEU" has around 200,000 members as of April 2025. On the subreddit, for example practical guides listing alternative European products are being shared. The website "Go European" launched by volunteers in February aims to make it easy to see which products are largely from the U.S. and which alternatives to these exist. The similar website European Alternatives launched in 2021 has seen a surge of users. The mobile app and browser extension "BuyEuropean" makes it easy for consumers to find out the exact origin of products and also shows relevant European alternatives when scanning or looking up products. However, the economic impact of such individual uncoordinated consumer decisions to avoid products using such software has been questioned. The impact could be negligible in part because only very few boycott calls can maintain momentum over a longer period of time.

=== Corporate responses ===
Several businesses took positions aligned with the boycott movement:

Denmark's largest retailer, the Salling Group, introduced black star-shaped stickers on price tags to indicate European-made products, citing customer demand for help identifying non-American goods. A YouGov survey of 2.055 adults indicated 77% of Germans support labeling European products.

Norway's Haltbakk Bunkers, an oil and fuel provider, announced it would no longer supply fuel to US Navy ships.

French company Groupe Roy Energie SAS canceled an order for 15 Tesla vehicles in favor of European models despite them costing more.

Ontario Premier Doug Ford terminated a CA$100 million (€63.3 million) contract with telecommunications company Starlink, stating that "Ontario won't do business with people hellbent on destroying our economy." President of France Emmanuel Macron has called on EU companies to pause investing in the United States as a response to U.S. tariffs.

=== Economic impact ===
==== Tourism ====
Total overseas visitors to the United States fell by 12% year-over-year in March 2025, representing the most severe drop since the COVID-19 pandemic. That month, Tourism Economics revised its forecast for inbound United States travel from 8.8% growth to a 5.1% decline. In April, the group projected a decline of 9.4%. The United States Travel Association estimated that even a 10% reduction in Canadian visitors could result in $2.1 billion in lost spending and 14,000 job losses.

Travel bookings from Canada to the United States for the April–September 2025 period decreased by more than 70% compared to the previous year. European tourism to the United States declined by 17% overall, with countries such as Ireland, Germany, and Norway experiencing decreases exceeding 20%.

==== Automobile industry ====
Tesla, Inc. sales in Europe declined significantly, with January 2025 registrations dropping to 9,913 units from 18,121 in January 2024. Overall, Tesla sales in Europe fell by approximately 45% year-over-year in early 2025. By the first quarter of 2025, Volkswagen had surpassed Tesla as the top electric vehicle seller in Europe.

==== Consumer goods ====
While comprehensive data on retail impact remains limited, anecdotal evidence suggests shifts in purchasing patterns away from recognizable American brands such as Coca-Cola, Jack Daniel's, Philadelphia cream cheese, Colgate toothpaste, and Hellmann's mayonnaise.

== Cultural impact ==
The boycott has had cultural ramifications beyond immediate economic effects. In Canada, the American national anthem was booed during sporting events with American teams. Christian Tetzlaff, a renowned German classical violinist, canceled a summer tour of the United States, citing his "utter anger" at the political situation. Former Canadian Prime Minister Justin Trudeau urged Canadians to "choose Canada" and adjust their vacation plans to stay within the country. French MEP Raphaël Glucksmann suggested the United States should "give us back the Statue of Liberty" during a rally, later clarifying: "No one, of course, will come and steal the Statue of Liberty. The statue is yours. But what it embodies belongs to everyone."

== Factors influencing participation ==
Several factors have been identified as motivating individuals to participate in the boycott:

=== Political opposition ===
Many participants cited opposition to specific policies or actions of the Trump administration as their primary motivation. Moya O'Sullivan, a teacher from Kilkenny, Ireland, told CNN: "It's very disappointing to me to see that half of America would choose [Trump]... The Americans didn't learn their lesson the first time. There unfortunately do need to be consequences."

=== Safety concerns ===
Some potential travelers expressed concerns about safety when visiting the United States. Canadian travel journalist Kate Dingwall stated: "My partner and I decided not to go ahead with our planned vacations to the United States this year. I worry about the border and getting stuck somehow, especially with how prickly Trump is to Canada. There's just a sense of uneasiness around visiting the United States at the moment."

=== National pride ===
The boycott movement has coincided with increased expressions of national and regional pride, particularly in Canada and Europe. Ontario business leader Dylan Lobo observed: "There's a lot of patriotism right now in this country. There's a huge sense that Canadians want to support other Canadians."

=== Environmental and economic considerations ===
Some participants highlighted potential benefits beyond political protest, including environmental advantages of reducing cross-border shipping and opportunities for developing local industries. Graham Markham, director of Canadian firm New Protein International, argued: "Canada has long been a successful supplier of raw materials to the world. The opportunity now is to stop exporting the job creation and innovation that comes from processing those materials domestically."

== Criticism and limitations ==
The boycott movement has faced criticism and acknowledged limitations:

=== Economic complexity ===
Critics have pointed out the challenges of identifying truly "American" products in a globalized economy. Many nominally American brands manufacture products internationally, while some American companies employ significant numbers of workers in the countries where boycotts are occurring.

=== Use of American digital platforms ===
Some boycott organizers use American-owned platforms to organize activities, such as the Boycott USA, Buy French! group on Facebook. One member commented that in some cases, there are no good alternatives to the digital products they use, or that they are required to use certain American tools for work. Édouard Roussez, founder of the French boycott group, defended this approach: "It's true that it's a bit strange to use Facebook, which is an American platform, to boycott the United States but, like the resistance fighters, we use all the tools we can to achieve our goal."

=== Scale limitations ===
Economists and market analysts have questioned whether consumer boycotts can significantly impact the overall American economy. Professor Alan Bradshaw of Royal Holloway, University of London, suggested: "Generally, any impact of a boycott will be most likely felt by the corporations rather than on the wider economy; consumers will buy a different car brand rather than not buy a car at all."

=== Unintended consequences ===
Some experts warned of potential negative consequences for consumers participating in the boycott. Meredith A. Crowley, professor of economics at the University of Cambridge, noted: "Domestic brands within Europe, as they wouldn't have so much competition from American brands, would have the power to raise their prices."

== American participation ==
Americans who oppose Trump's policies have been reported buying foreign products or traveling to foreign destinations in solidarity with other countries.

== Historical context ==
Analysts have compared the 2025 boycott to previous consumer movements, including the renaming of french fries to "freedom fries" in the United States during 2003 when France opposed the invasion of Iraq. However, the digital dimension and international coordination of the 2025 movement represent significant evolutions from previous consumer boycotts. Thomas F. Goodwin of the Exhibitions and Conferences Alliance emphasized the human impact of such boycotts: "It's US workers and small businesses who get affected by US travel boycotts. When international business travellers forgo coming to the US, everyone from exposition booth builders and general service contractors to venue caterers and individual skilled labourers suffer – not politicians or the government."
