= 2025–2026 Canadian boycott of the United States =

- Part of the 2025 United States trade war with Canada and Mexico
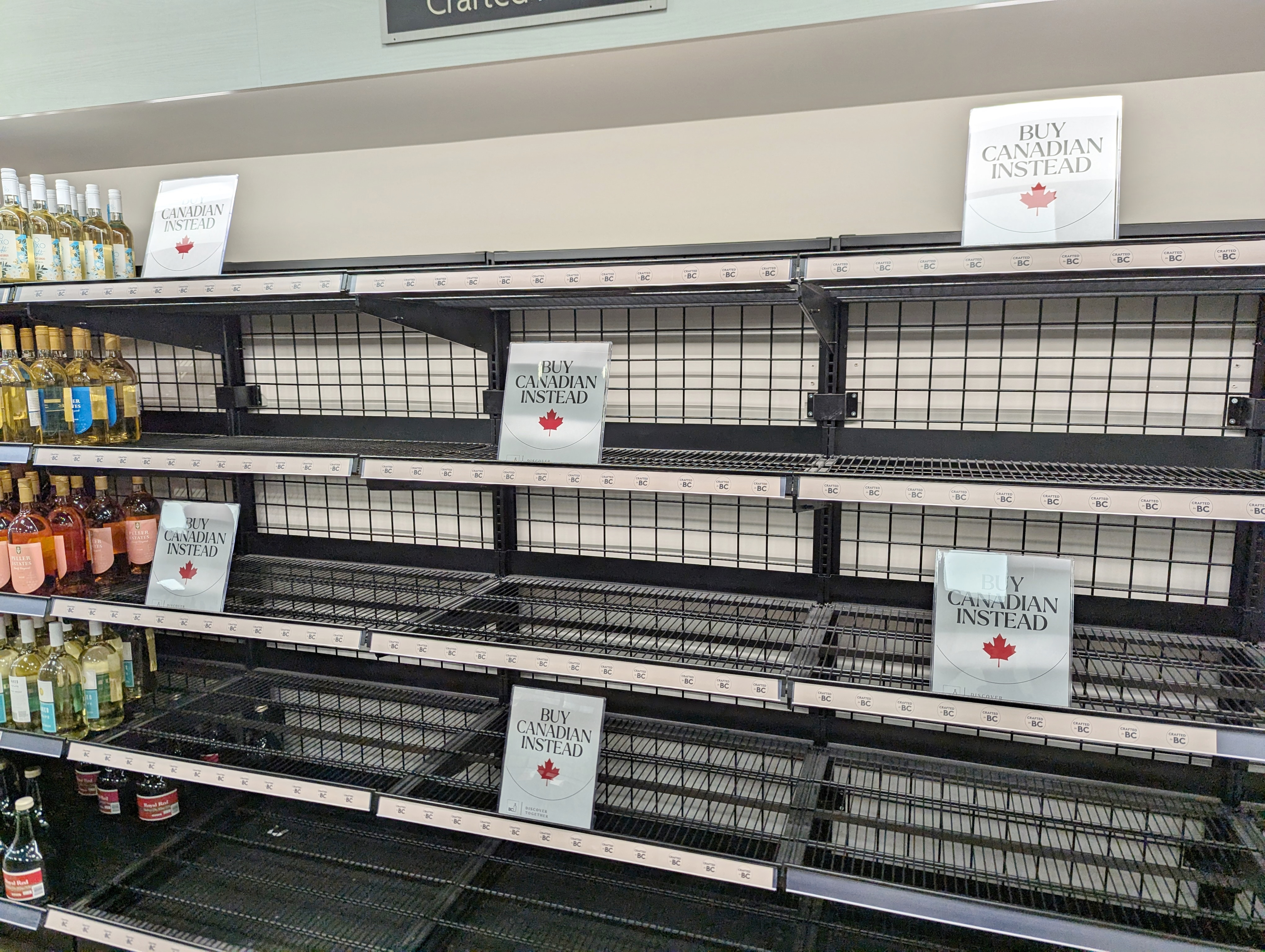
- "Buy Canadian Instead" signs on empty shelves at a BC Liquor Store in New Westminster
- Date: February 1, 2025 – present (1 year, 9 months, 2 weeks and 3 days)
- Location: Canada
- Type: Boycott
- Cause: Threats to annex Canada by Donald Trump (majority); Near-universal tariffs being placed on Canadian goods exported into the United States
- Motive: Retaliation against tariffs; Aim to increase domestic production and consumption, and inter-provincial trade, within Canada
- Target: Federal government of the United States; Economy of the United States; Donald Trump
- Participants: Canadians and citizens of regions around the world, especially Europe
- Outcome: Decreased relations, including trading relations, between the United States and Canada; Increased popular support for the boycott; Cancellation of trips to the United States by Canadians; Fuel in Canadian anti-Americanism

In the context of the 2025 United States trade war with Canada and Mexico, a boycott of the United States began in Canada, including both American consumer products and travel to the US.

This boycott occurs in the context of polling finding that 91% of Canadians want Canada to rely less on the US, an option preferred over repairing the relationship with the US. The shift in attitude towards the United States has been described as unprecedented by many. In February 2025, 90% of Canadians stated they followed the issue of the trade war closely, the highest level of engagement with a news item since the beginning of the COVID-19 pandemic.

The Canadian boycott also occurs within the context of some residents of other countries like Denmark and Sweden boycotting the United States, its products, and/or brands associated with Donald Trump's presidency like Tesla.

== Boycott of US products ==
In late February 2025, an Angus Reid Institute poll found that 98% of respondents said they were "looking for 'Made in Canada' when they peruse the aisles." "Half (48%) say they're replacing as many as they can find substitutes for, while 37 per cent say they are replacing those where they can find a similar price and quality," for a total of 85% of respondents saying they are replacing at least some American products. Some Canadians have joined "Buy Canadian" groups on social media like Facebook, with one group being reported to have 1.2 million members (as of early March 2025). Various apps (e.g. Maple Scan, Buy Canadian, Is This Canadian?, O SCANada, and Shop Canadian) were also created to help Canadian shoppers avoid American products.

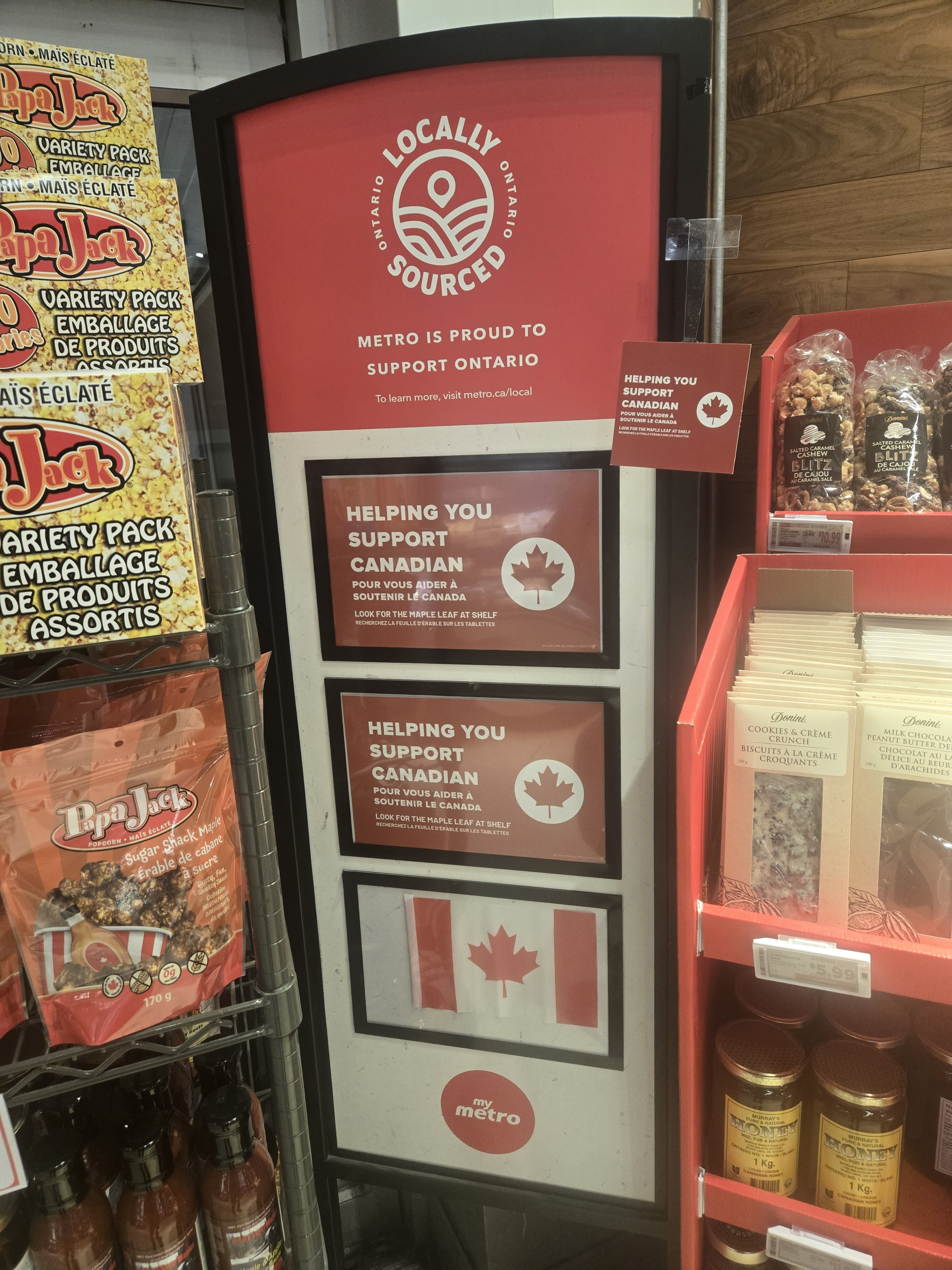
A display at a Metro grocery store in Ottawa advocating for supporting local products

Canadian businesses have put up signs encouraging customers to buy Canadian products, or tags identifying made-in-Canada products. The Guardian cites Kenneth Wong, an associate professor at Queen's University, as saying "he had been surprised by an apparently organic response among Canadian consumers: on a visit to his local grocery store, homegrown apples were sold out, while next to them, a bin of US apples appeared to be untouched." Some Canadians have voiced willingness to pay more to avoid American products. The boycott led to a marked increased in consumer complaints about labelling to the Canadian Food Inspection Agency, in particular relating to country of origin, given the boycott participants' reliance on labels to avoid US products.

The boycott of American products has included American streaming platforms like Netflix and Disney+.

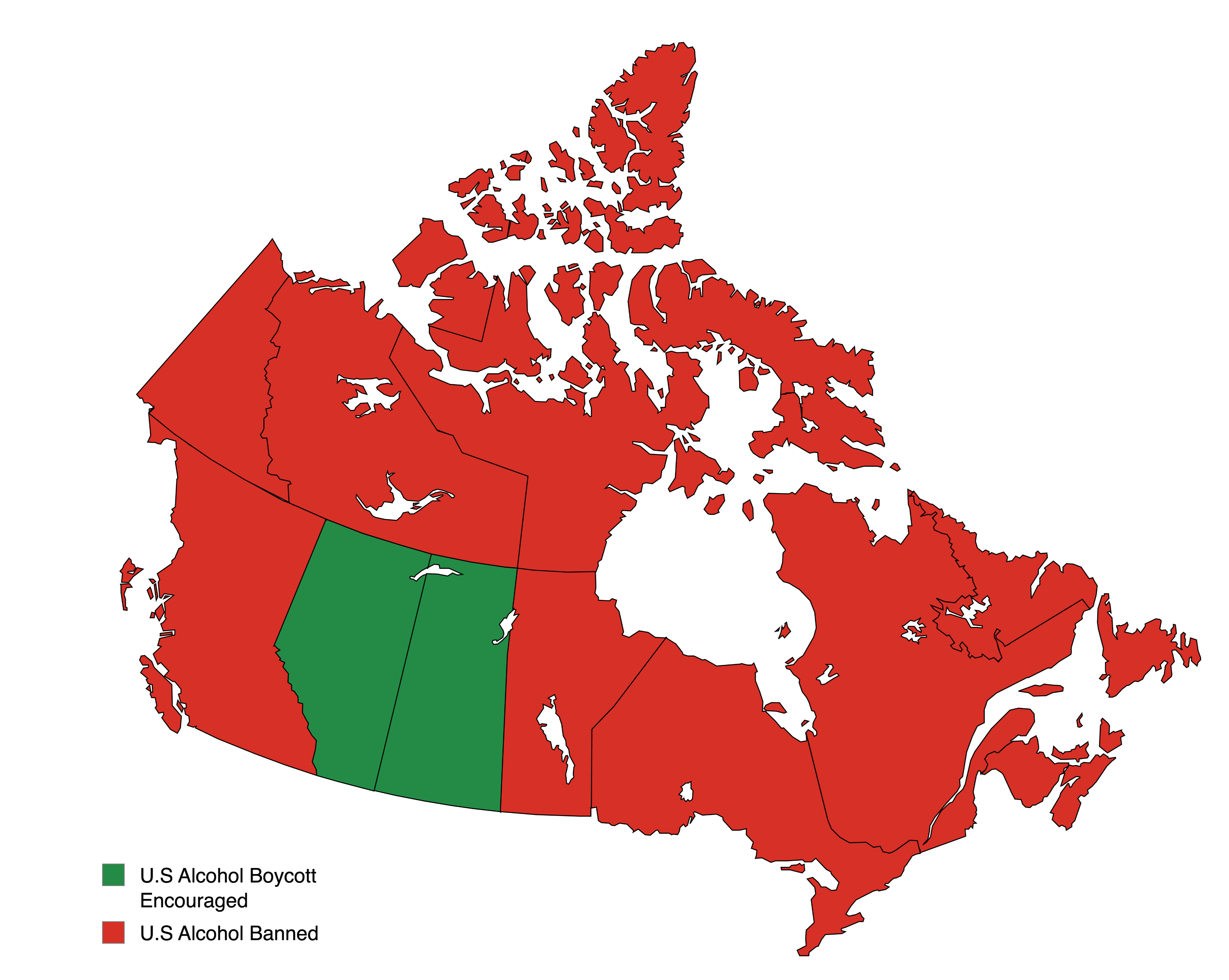
U.S Alcohol ban by province

=== US alcohol ===
All Canadian provinces except Alberta and Saskatchewan removed American alcohols from their stores in early 2025. As a result, wine exports from the U.S. to Canada dropped by US$343m between 2024 and 2025 (from US$446.5m to US$103.7m). Canadian imports of US spirits dropped from US$324.6m to $176m in the same period, and Canadian imports of US beer from $46.7m to $16.7m. In Ontario, sales of local wines went up by around 79% in the first year of the boycott.

Manitoba and Nova Scotia, while having stopped importing American alcohols, decided to sell their remaining inventory of American alcohols and give the proceeds to charity.

== Boycott of travel to the US ==
The boycott also includes travel to the United States. According to Statistics Canada, in 2025, "Canadian-resident return trips from the United States totalled 29.1 million, down 25.4%. By contrast, overseas trips by Canadian residents were up 9.2% compared with 2024, to 14.2 million." A study based on cell-phone data, on the other hand, estimated that travel was down 42% during the year from April 2025 to March 2026 in comparison to the year from April 2024 to March 2025. The authors took their results to show that "when Canadians travel to the U.S., they are visiting fewer locations and staying for less time than they used to."

In 2025, Canadians spent C$3.3bn less in the US than in 2024, and their spending in countries other than the US and Canada increased by C$3.6bn. The US spending dropped from C$22.1bn to C$18.8bn. Compared to 2024, Canadian international travel increased by 14% (to Europe) and 17% (to Asia).

Canadian tourists spent $20.5 billion USD in the United States in 2024, with 20.4 million Canadians visiting the country.

In mid February, an Angus Reid survey found that 48% of respondents had already "or [were] seriously likely to" cancel or delay plans to travel to the US. In late February, another survey found that, of the 20% of Quebecers who had plans to travel to the US in 2025, 45% had either already cancelled or intended to cancel their trip. This represents an estimated $3 billion CAD economic loss for the US. Bookings for leisure travel to the US by flight was 40% lower in February 2025 than February 2024. However, in terms of actual travel rather than bookings, return trips by Canadians to the United States by air were near constant (2.4% lower in February 2025 than February 2024). Return trips by car by Canadians to the US were 23% lower than in February 2024, dropping from 1.5m to 1.2m. In polling conducted in late February, Abacus Data found that of the 32% of Canadians who were planning to travel to the US in 2025, 56% had either cancelled their trip or modified it in favour of a destination other than the US, with an additional 26% "considering [their] options" or saying they "could" change their travel plans.

By March 2025, flight bookings to the United States from Canada had fallen by 71–76% in comparison with bookings in March 2024. Airlines responded to this decline in demand by cutting 320,000 seats from Canada-US flight routes by March, representing a 3.5% cutback for the summer months. In total, 4.11m travellers crossed from Canada into the US (by air or land) in March 2025, compared to 4.97m in March 2024.

Travel agencies have reported drops in travel to the United States, with increases in travel to other places such as the Caribbean, Mexico or Europe. The Kingston-based tour company Maple Leaf Tours reported their US package took a 30% hit via cancellations.

Many businesses in the US and at the border have described a loss of customers, including touristic operations in the US. Duty-free shops reported a decline in sales of 40–50% between January and April 2025. In March 2025, the Surrey-based owner of a duty-free shop at the US-Canada border said that as a result of decreased Canadian travel to the United States, "Our business has dropped over 80 per cent and now we have reduced our staff and reduced our working hours. This morning, we are now operating on a skeleton staff of only three to four people when usually we have about 20 people working."

In addition to going to other places like the Caribbean, Mexico or Europe, many Canadians have taken to travelling within Canada instead. Provinces have noted increased interest from Canadian tourists, and are deploying new ad campaigns to encourage Canadians to visit. Manitoba increased the budget of Tourism Manitoba by $4.5m for this purpose. Travel agencies and businesses in Canada have also noted an increase in visitors.

There may be a variety of reasons behind the fall in visits to the US, including not just the boycott but also a weak Canadian dollar and fear of the US immigration authorities.

A rise has been noted in dual citizens renouncing their American citizenship. Bob Ezrin, who has dual Canadian and American citizenship, also moved back to Canada from the United States in addition to renouncing his American citizenship.

=== Florida ===
Of 142 million visitors to Florida in 2024, 3.3 million were Canadians. They accounted for 3 times more visitors than any other single country; the second most common country of origin was the United Kingdom which accounted for 1.1 million visitors in 2024.

A Quebec-based travel agent specializing in travel to Disney and Universal destinations stated that her reservations dropped by 60% from February to March 2025. Some American travel agencies even left the Canadian market entirely, due to the drop in demand.

Some Canadian snowbirds have sold their properties. CBC News writes of the Fort Lauderdale, Florida, real estate agent Alexandra DuPont that "She's currently listing 35 properties, she said, and about 30 of those are owned by Canadians. Meanwhile, she has zero Canadian buyers. It's unprecedented in her 12 years of selling real estate." More than a million Canadians go to Fort Lauderdale every year and contribute $600 million USD to the local economy.

There is anecdotal evidence of some Canadian travellers cancelling trips even at the loss of their deposit. For example, one Florida motel owner said that "I've seen a customer dropping a $1,000 deposit to choose to go to Cuba instead"; a woman from British Columbia even let go of a $5,000 CAD deposit to cancel a five-week vacation to Palm Springs, California. However, some travel agents have described such cancellations as being rare.

== Official support for the boycott ==
The boycott has received support from Canadian politicians, notably with Prime Minister Justin Trudeau on February 1, 2025, calling on Canadians to "choose Canadian products and services rather than American ones" wherever possible. Foreign Minister Mélanie Joly, on a February 3 appearance on Tout le monde en parle, also suggested to cancel or avoid travel to the US. On March 5, Alberta announced plans for a "substantial" advertising campaign to help Albertans identify Canadian products. Most provincial liquor boards have also taken US products off the shelves.

== Canadians' views on the target of the boycott ==
Widespread anger towards Donald Trump and the United States is fuelling the boycott, but different Canadians apparently have different views in terms of the target of their boycott and the culprit behind the situation Canada finds itself in. Indeed, summarising comments it had received from Canadians, The Guardian writes, "While some people said they were differentiating between the Trump administration and their American neighbours, others shared feelings of personal hostility towards the American population, saying they wanted to 'stick it to' their 'poorly educated neighbours to the south,' as one woman from British Columbia put it, echoing the remarks of many." Likewise, a woman from New Brunswick said, "The relationship is broken. A great many Canadians hate the USA now. How can you remain on good terms with a neighbour who threatens your economy and jokes about bringing you to your knees?"

In contrast, many Canadians put the blame on Donald Trump alone. Ontario Premier Doug Ford, for example, said this repeatedly in his news conference on March 4 responding to the enactment of tariffs by Trump. "It's not the people of America, it's not the elected officials, it's one person that has caused this issue, and that was President Trump." He went on to state that in his view, Ontario's retaliations against the US tariffs were "the last thing I want to do. I want to put more alcohol on the shelves. I want to give you more electricity. I want to do everything I can to have a great relationship with our closest friends that we absolutely love."

Some cafes have been reported to be renaming the americano coffee as the 'canadiano'.

== Americans' views on the boycott ==
Sympathetic Americans who oppose Trump's policies have substituted American products for Canadian ones to show solidarity.

The state of California responded to the boycott by launching a tourism campaign encouraging Canadians to visit it; the city of Palm Springs put up signs across its downtown reading "Palm Springs Loves Canada," with the mayor, Ron deHarte, noting that Canadians spend $300 million a year in the region and commenting that they are known to volunteer in the city. Some tourism operators in the US also started offering exclusive deals for Canadian tourists.

In addition to a drop in Canadian travel to the US, there has also been a drop in Americans travelling to Canada in 2025.

The US ambassador to Canada Pete Hoekstra commented in July 2025 on the Canadian boycott: "Canadians staying home, that's their business, you know. I don't like it, but if that's what they want to do, it's fine. They want to ban American alcohol. That's fine. There are reasons why the president and some of his team referred to Canada as being mean and nasty to deal with, OK, because of some of those steps." A spokesperson for the US Embassy later wrote to CBC News, "As Ambassador Hoekstra has expressed on several occasions, the U.S. government sees the provincial bans on U.S. alcohol as counterproductive to resolving the broader issues." In September 2025, when asked what surprised him about Canada since starting his position as ambassador, Hoekstra further commented that "I'm disappointed that I came to Canada — a Canada that it is very, very difficult to find Canadians who are passionate about the American-Canadian relationship. You ran a campaign where it was anti-American, elbows up, me too. You know, that was an anti-American campaign. That has continued. That's disappointing." He also commented in September 2025 that the US would have "to take a look" at pre-clearance in Canadian airports due to decreased Canadian travel to the US.

== See also ==
- 2025 United States boycott
- Tesla Takedown
- Buy local
