= Lawrence B. Glickman =

American historian

- Born: January 10, 1963; New York
- Citizenship: American
- Education: Princeton University (BA); University of California, Berkeley (PhD)
- Occupations: History professor and author
- Employer: Cornell University

Lawrence Bennett Glickman (born January 10, 1963) is an American historian who serves as the Stephen and Evalyn Milman Professor in American Studies in the Department of History at Cornell University. He is an author or editor of four books and several articles on consumerism.

== Life ==
Previously he taught at the University of South Carolina. Glickman earned a Princeton University B.A. in history magna cum laude in 1985, a M.A. in 1989 and his Ph.D. in 1992 both from University of California, Berkeley. His dissertation, supervised by Lawrence W. Levine, was titled "A Living Wage: Political Economy, Gender, and Consumerism in American Culture, 1880-1925."

He taught at the University of South Carolina as the Carolina Trustee Professor and chair of the history department from 1992 to 2014. He has taught at Cornell University since 2014.

== Books ==
- Glickman, Lawrence B. A Living Wage: American Workers and the Making of Consumer Society. Cornell University Press, 1997.
- Cook, James W., Lawrence B. Glickman, and Michael O'Malley, eds. The Cultural Turn in US History: Past, Present, and Future. University of Chicago Press, 2008.
- Glickman, Lawrence B. Buying Power: A History of Consumer Activism in America. University of Chicago Press, 2009.
- Glickman, Lawrence B. Free Enterprise: An American History. Yale University Press, 2019.
