= Newshole =

Journalism term

A newshole is a journalism term that stands for the amount of space available daily for news in a newspaper. The column inches reserved for newshole are usually the remaining spaces after paid advertisements are filled.

From 1957 to 1975, a typical daily newspaper in the United States used approximately 45% of its space for nonadvertising content.
