= Criticism of Tesla, Inc. =

Systemic criticism of Tesla, Inc. and its products and leadership

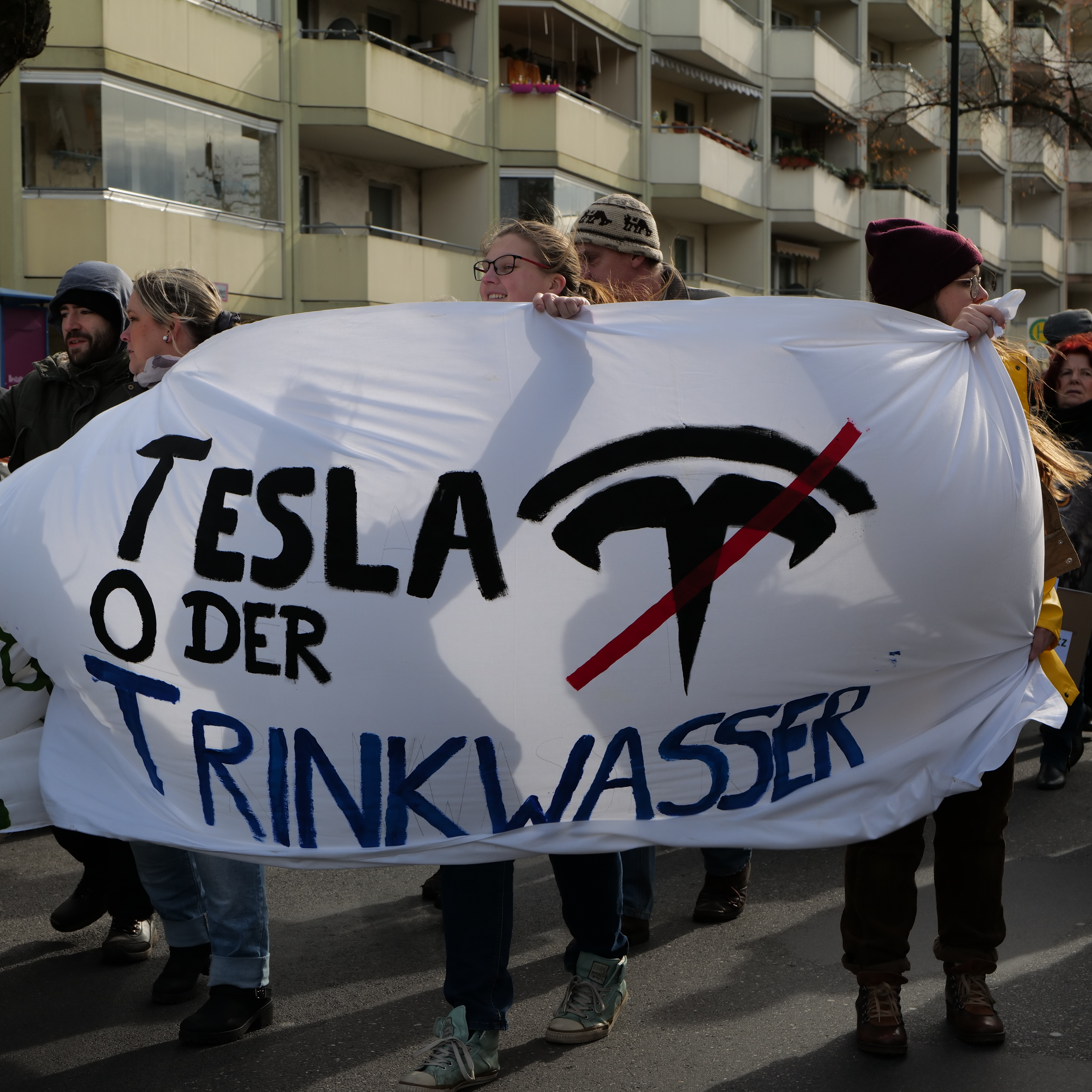
Protest against the building of a Tesla Gigafactory on February 22, 2020. The text reads, "Tesla or Drinking Water."

Tesla, Inc. has been criticized for its cars, workplace culture, business practices, and occupational safety. Many of the criticisms are also directed toward Elon Musk, the company's CEO and Product Architect. Critics have also accused Tesla of deceptive marketing, unfulfilled promises, and fraud. The company is currently facing criminal and civil investigations into its self-driving claims. Critics have highlighted Tesla's downplaying of issues, and Tesla's alleged retaliation against several whistleblowers.

The safety and quality of Tesla cars and services have been questioned. There have been hundreds of reports of sudden unintended acceleration (which the NHTSA attributed to drivers pressing the wrong pedal), brake failures, and "whompy wheels" – collapsing wheels due to faulty car suspension. These safety and quality problems have been compounded in the past by the poor wait times of Tesla's customer service. Some features such as Autopilot, Full Self-Driving beta, and Passenger Play (a feature allowing riders to play Tesla games while in motion) have been criticized for their careless deployment. Critics have noted that some Tesla cars have had poor build quality due to rushed testing, leading to a high ratio of flawed vehicles. Others criticize the company's "stealth" vehicle recalls, requiring customers to sign non-disclosure agreements.

Relationships between Musk, Tesla board members, employees, and unions have been complicated, partly resulting in a high turnover rate. Employees have reported poor treatment and policies, resulting in a high injury rate, with some having faced sexual harassment, racism, and union-busting incidents. Tesla's environmental practices, use of cryptocurrencies, and compliance with open source licenses have been mentioned by critics. Detractors also claim that Tesla and Musk's public relations activities have been used to deflect criticisms.

Musk and his company have been repeatedly accused of engaging in fraud, such as in their buyout of SolarCity, selling defective vehicles, overpromising, and posting reckless tweets. One tweet resulted in Musk agreeing to pay a fine and step down as Tesla's chairman. Courts ruled in Musk's favor in the SolarCity case, and a jury found that he was not liable to investors over the "funding secured" tweet. Proponents and opponents of Tesla consistently accuse each other of conflicts of interest, believing Tesla's stock valuation is either under- or over-valued.

== Fraud allegations ==
=== SolarCity buyout ===
The so-described "SolarCity debacle" led a group of Tesla shareholders to file a lawsuit alleging Musk breached his fiduciary duties and unjustly enriched himself in Tesla's buyout of SolarCity in 2016. The shareholders claim that Musk knew SolarCity was going broke before the buyout, that Musk failed to properly recuse himself from the deal-making process, and that the deal was, in effect, a bailout of Musk's cousins Peter and Lyndon Rive. In order to gain shareholder support for the buyout, Musk unveiled the Solar Roof in October 2016, but the Solar Roof tiles that Musk displayed were later revealed to be fake. The trial was held in July 2021. The court ruled in Musk's favor in April 2022. In June 2023, Delaware's Supreme Court upheld the ruling.

=== "Funding secured" ===
In September 2018, the U.S. Securities and Exchange Commission (SEC) charged Musk with securities fraud for his "false and misleading" statements after tweeting that he had "funding secured" to take Tesla private. The SEC also charged Tesla with failing to have adequate controls and procedures in place regarding Musk's tweets.

Musk settled the fraud charges with the SEC in 2018, agreeing to pay a $20 million fine and stepping down as Tesla's chairman. Tesla also agreed to pay a $20 million fine and put in place additional controls to oversee Musk's communications.

According to The Wall Street Journal, the SEC told Tesla in May 2020 that the company had failed "to enforce these procedures and controls despite repeated violations by Mr. Musk". A lawsuit filed in March 2021 alleges that Musk violated his fiduciary duty to Tesla by continuing to send "erratic" tweets in violation of the SEC settlement, and that the board has failed to control Musk. On April 1, 2022, a federal judge ruled that Musk "recklessly made the [2018] statements with knowledge as to their falsity". According to The Wall Street Journal, comments made by Musk later in April 2022 disputing the factual basis of his settlement with the SEC were potentially in violation of the settlement agreement. In February 2023, a nine-person jury in San Francisco rejected investors' claims that Musk and Tesla had defrauded them with the tweets. In April 2024, the U.S. Supreme Court declined to hear Musk's appeal seeking to end the part of the SEC settlement that requires a Tesla lawyer to pre-approve some of his posts.

=== Accounting ===
In 2017, a lawsuit alleged Tesla made materially false and misleading statements regarding its preparedness to produce Model 3 cars. The U.S. Department of Justice also began an investigation in 2018 into whether Tesla misled investors and misstated production figures about the Model 3. The lawsuit was dismissed in Tesla's favor in March 2019.

In 2018 Francine McKenna, investigative journalist and lecturer in accounting at Wharton, claimed Tesla made use of new revenue recognition accounting rules (adopted 1 January 2018) to post a first-quarter revenue beat. The new rules allow cars leased through its leasing partners to generally qualify to be accounted for as sales with a right of return, rather than operating leases, allowing an accelerating recording of revenue for Tesla. In May 2018, Tesla reported a final adjustment of $623 million to its cumulative earnings resulting from the revenue recognition change.

In November 2019, hedge fund manager David Einhorn accused Elon Musk of "significant fraud" and in April 2020, questioned Tesla's accounting, in particular their large accounts receivable balance. Musk responded on X (formerly Twitter) to Einhorn's claims with a kissing-face emoji and attached a letter signed "Treelon Musk" containing "...It is understandable you wish to save face with your investors ... [and] desire to feel somehow relevant with your Tesla short position." In the same letter, Musk promised to send Einhorn "a small gift of short shorts". Einhorn later received a package of shorts from Musk but Einhorn noted they came with "some manufacturing defects".

The SEC received a whistleblower complaint in 2021 from former Tesla employee Lukasz Krupski detailing numerous allegations that Tesla "may have violated securities law and flouted accounting standards." The SEC looked at one portion of the complaint, then closed the investigation without interviewing the submitters or evaluating the 18,000 files of documentation. As reported first by Handelsblatt, Krupski then leaked the so-called Tesla Files, leading to court injunctions and warnings from the corporation. Krupski received the 2023 Blueprint Europe Whistleblowing Prize for his work. The Tesla Files, a book by Sönke Iwersen and Michael Verfürden based on the material uncovered by Krupski, was published on 24 July 2025 by Penguin Michael Joseph.

=== Autopilot and Full Self-Driving fraud ===
As of October 2022, Tesla is facing a criminal probe from the US Department of Justice over claims it has made about its "Full Self-Driving" driver-assist system or capability. Critics call out the company for selling and promoting its so-called Full Self-Driving (FSD) beta add-on when the software requires drivers' constant supervision and is not actually capable of full self-driving. Tesla's Full Self-Driving beta is generally considered a SAE Level 2 advanced driver-assistance system, similar to competitors' offerings such as General Motors' Super Cruise and Ford's Co-Pilot360. Legal scholars William Widen and Philip Koopman argue that Tesla has misrepresented FSD beta as SAE level 2 in order to "avoid regulatory oversight and permitting processes required of more highly automated vehicles." They argue that FSD beta should actually be considered a SAE level 4 technology, and have urged state Departments of Transportation in the U.S. to classify it as such, because publicly available videos show that "beta test drivers operate their vehicles as if to validate SAE Level 4 (high driving automation) features, often revealing dramatically risky situations created by use of the vehicles in this manner."

Tesla has benefited from increased sales and profit margins due to sales of the FSD option in particular, priced at $15,000 as of September 2022. In April 2019, when Tesla was low on capital, Musk announced that Tesla would have one million robotaxis on the road by the end of 2020; a few weeks later Tesla sold stock to raise an additional $3 billion, solving its cash troubles.

Elon Musk has repeatedly claimed that Tesla vehicles will be capable of full autonomy in the near future, but a Freedom of Information Act request made by PlainSite revealed that Tesla told the California Department of Motor Vehicles (DMV) in December 2020 they "do not expect significant enhancements" to the Full Self-Driving software that would enable full self-driving. In May 2021, the California DMV said it was investigating whether Tesla violated state regulations by misleading customers in its claims about "full self-driving". Bryant Walker Smith, an autonomous vehicle law expert at the University of South Carolina, said "it's so obviously clear that there's a contradiction" between what Tesla is saying in its marketing of Full Self-Driving versus what its lawyers and engineers have told the DMV. Smith said that using the name Full Self-Driving "leaves the domain of the misleading and irresponsible to something that could be called fraudulent". In August 2022, records surfaced showing that the California DMV had formally accused Tesla of false advertising Autopilot and FSD in July.

In Germany in July 2020, authorities ruled that Tesla misled consumers regarding the "abilities of its automated driving systems" and banned it from using certain marketing language implying autonomous driving capabilities. Upon appeal, that decision was reversed in 2021 by a higher court under the condition that Tesla clarify the capabilities of Autopilot on its website.

In a 2021 lawsuit against Tesla, Texas police officers claimed "systematic fraud" involving Tesla Autopilot after a Model X crashed into two parked police cars. As of October 2022, a trial has been requested. Further developments in that case are not clear and have not been reported on. In September 2022, Tesla was sued by drivers in a proposed class action suit over alleged false advertising of Autopilot and FSD. In August 2025, a federal judge allowed the case to proceed as a class action for California buyers, but in October 2026 the Ninth Circuit threw out the certification, ruling that the plaintiffs had not shown that all buyers had seen Tesla's statements about its self-driving hardware. Tesla has denied the claims.

Insiders revealed to the press in 2022 that the U.S. Department of Justice launched an investigation in 2022 following reports of more than a dozen crashes that involved Autopilot. Then, in a 2023 quarterly company report, Tesla stated receiving subpoenas from the Department in connection with the investigation and other probes.

=== Reselling defective vehicles ===
In mid 2020, Tesla was accused of reselling defective "lemon" cars in the U.S. and Europe, followed by accounts of Norway Tesla service centers using lemons as loaners. Multiple customers have accused Tesla of knowingly selling defective vehicles in China as well. In September 2021, a Chinese court ruled that Tesla had acted in a fraudulent manner by reselling a customer a defective used Model S car.

== Musk's promises ==
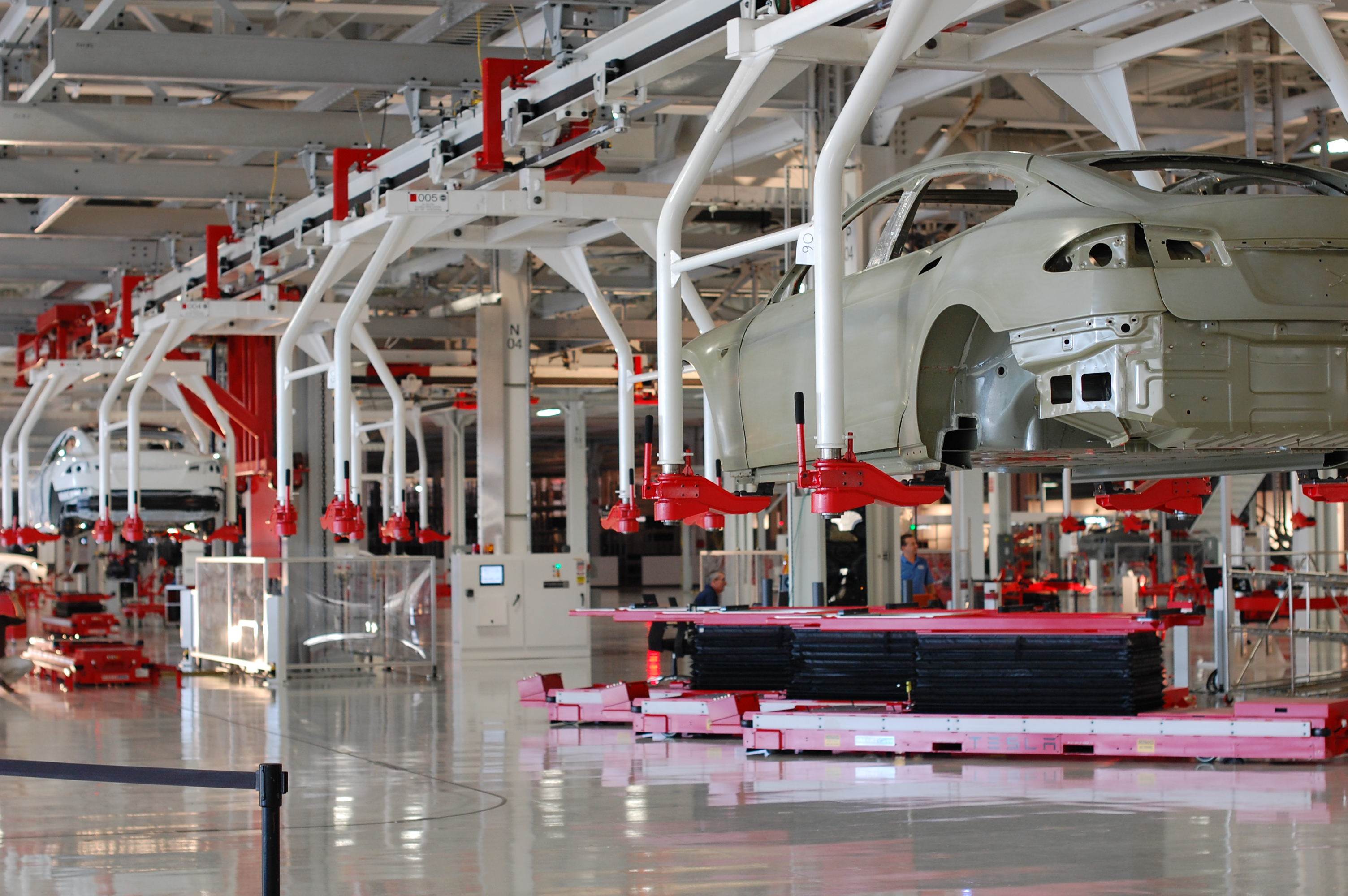
Tesla factory at the Tesla Fremont Factory in 2011. Automation of car production is prevalent.

According to journalist Bethany McLean, skeptics have come to see Elon Musk's attempts at promoting Tesla as "more unhinged than iconoclastic", and noted his "penchant for making grandiose statements that he either knows are not true at the time he makes them, or that he has no real intent of following through on." Other critics characterize Musk's overpromising as "unethical" or manipulative in order to "raise capital, collect customer deposits, or secure regulatory benefits." Musk has made numerous promises about Tesla that have failed to come true, including:

- Musk claimed in 2016 that the Nevada Gigafactory would be a net zero-emissions facility, running on 100% renewable energy from solar panels covering the factory's roof. The Gigafactory needs at least 300 megawatts of power, but as of September 2022, Tesla has only 8 megawatts of solar panels on the Gigafactory roof.
- In 2018, Musk conceded that his 2016 plan for "excessive automation at Tesla was a mistake." Tesla ended up building some of its Model 3 cars in a tent using mostly manual labor who used shortcuts.
- In 2018, Musk said "Brake pads on a Tesla literally never need to be replaced for lifetime of the car." The price to change a Tesla's brakes is CA$8,500.
- Musk said that 2019 would be the "year of the solar roof," and was hoping Tesla would manufacture 1,000 roofs a week by the end of the year. Publications estimated that solar roofs were installed on fewer than 100 homes and challenged his prediction. Then, in June 2020, Tesla cancelled many customers' orders for solar roof installations, saying they were outside of their service area. Customers complained about this decision since they had placed $1,000 deposits for pre-orders as early as 2017. As of June 2022, about 23 roofs per week are being installed.
- In 2021, it was reported CEOs of major automotive manufacturers had approached Tesla for electric vehicle technology that it was supposedly open to sharing and were instead offered the opportunity to purchase regulatory credits by Musk, suggesting that the company and Musk "may not be not as eager for the electric revolution to occur as [they claim]".
- From 2013 to 2024, Musk has promised some form of full self-driving "next year" or the end of that year each year. Starting in at least 2019, Musk has claimed that Tesla vehicles are capable of "full self-driving," but Tesla's Autopilot is only a Level 2 advanced driver-assistance system, requiring drivers to maintain full attention and be prepared to take control of the vehicle at a moment's notice. In 2019, Tesla sold a "Full Self-Driving capability" package, despite the technology not yet being available. Experts stated the 2020 prediction was unrealistic and Tesla had no chance of achieving it. In April 2020, Musk admitted that "punctuality is not my strong suit". In 2021, Tesla was ranked last for both strategy and execution in the autonomous driving sector by Guidehouse Insights.

== Misuse of government subsidies ==
Tesla has been accused of gaming the California Air Resources Board system for zero-emission vehicle credits by launching a "battery swap" program that was never made available to the public. In 2018, the state of Oregon reclaimed $13 million from Tesla after an investigation found that SolarCity had falsely inflated the prices on 14 large-scale solar projects in 2010–2014 by over 100% in order to qualify for higher tax credits.

Since 2019, Tesla has sold a 94-mile range Model 3 in Canada in order to thwart their limits on electric vehicle tax incentives, which has cost Canadian taxpayers C$115 million. Aaron Wudrick, director of the Canadian Taxpayers Federation, accused Tesla of gaming the system by listing the no-frills model one dollar below the program's cut-off price of C$45,000. As of October 2020, Tesla had sold only 126 of the base model, versus 12,000 of the higher-end Standard Range Plus. Wudrick said, "Tesla and their wealthier customers are making off like bandits at taxpayers' expense."

Tesla has faced significant criticism regarding its Giga New York factory, which was built and equipped using nearly $1 billion in New York taxpayer money. Allegations in 2018 and 2019 include inflated job promises, cost overruns, construction delays, and a lack of effort from Musk.

Many observers have criticized Musk and Tesla's dependence on government subsidies. Critics have argued that these subsidies are inefficient and inequitable, as they go mainly to high-income households. As of 2015, Musk's companies Tesla, SolarCity, and SpaceX benefited from an estimated $4.9 billion in government subsidies. In December 2020, journalist Jacob Silverman in The New Republic accused Tesla and Musk of "grifting the government" and getting "unimaginably rich by maximally gaming the government's largesse".

In March 2025 it was reported based on publicly available data that Tesla completed 8,653 EV sales in the final 72 hours of the now paused Canadian EV incentive (iZEV) program, accounting for approximately $43 million (Canadian funds) in incentives being paid to the company prior to funds for the program being exhausted. One Tesla store claimed 2,558 sales in a single Saturday. This led to accusations of Tesla "gaming the system" and calls for an investigation. On March 18, Transport Canada said it was "assessing" Tesla's last-minute claims and members of the opposition NDP called for a freeze of payments. A further investigation revealed that the Transport Canada website containing the program rules was modified after the initial news broke to loosen the rules to allow rebates to be submitted after the cars were delivered. This raised questions about whether the rule was never actually enforced or merely a "suggestion". On March 25, two days after new Prime Minister Mark Carney asked the Governor General to dissolve parliament and call an election for April 28th, former Transport Minister Chrystia Freeland confirmed to media that she had prior to the election call directed the department to freeze payments to Tesla pending an investigation, and to change the eligibility criteria for future incentive programs to ensure Tesla vehicles would not be eligible in response to U.S. imposed tariffs on imports of Canadian goods. Freeland had previously floated the idea of imposing 100% import tariffs on Tesla vehicles while running for her party's leadership. In April 2025, Electrek reported that it had obtained a letter dated March 28 from Tesla's director of sales and service for Canada to Transport Canada, which defended the company's claims and said Tesla might pursue legal action if payments were not resumed. In July 2025, Transport Canada said that Tesla's claims had been "determined to legitimately represent cars sold before January 12", and that all dealerships' claims had been evaluated using the same criteria.

== Fandom ==
Tesla has been noted for having an especially loyal and devoted fanbase, which has been likened to a cult, in particular a cult of personality around Elon Musk. According to Vice, there are "quasi-religious overtones" in any debate about Tesla. Ed Niedermeyer characterizes the culture that Tesla has fostered as "ambitious, aggressive, ruthless, defensive, and unapologetic" and has speculated that Musk orchestrated a "hype campaign" to gain fans and positive media coverage.

Tesla's loyal fan base has frequently turned toxic, attacking critics with "relentless fervor" while focused on harassing female journalists. An account in the Detroit Free Press illustrated the serious threats made by fans to a fellow Tesla owner and videoblogger for praising the Ford Mustang Mach-E. Scientist and engineer Missy Cummings was also the subject of personal harassment by Tesla advocates following the announcement of her joining the NHTSA as a senior advisor. Jennifer Homendy, head of the National Transportation Safety Board, said that the attacks against Cummings were a calculated attempt to distract from safety questions regarding Tesla's driver-assist and "full self-driving" technologies. Separately, Tesla fans became the subject of ridicule themselves after several fans independently tested Autopilot's automated braking system using children and homemade child-like dummies. Videos of some of the tests were later removed from YouTube for violating their child endangerment policy.

Mawk	Twitter
@mawk_au

Martin Eberhard is responsible for all of Tesla's success

15 June 2019

Avatar of Elon Musk

Elon Musk
Twitter
@elonmusk

Good example. Tesla is alive in spite of Eberhard, but he seeks credit constantly & fools give it him.

15 June 2019

An article from Deutschlandfunk describes how "online armies take on defense work and information policy for Elon Musk" via tech blogs and social media. In addition, Tesla's clean-energy division Tesla Energy is alleged to have a team dedicated to searching for customer complaints on social media and asking them to delete their comments. A separate team is dedicated to managing negative social media posts aimed specifically at Elon Musk. Electrek, the largest electric car news site, has consistently promoted Tesla and has been accused of failing to disclose its conflicts of interest and close relationship with Tesla. Researchers found 186 bot accounts on Twitter that have consistently published positive sentiments about Tesla, which they say "may have buffered the Tesla narrative from an emergent group of critics, relieved downward pressure on the Tesla stock price and amplified pro-Tesla sentiment from the time of the firm's IPO in June 2010 to the end of 2020."

== Musk's role in politics and government ==
Elon Musk's involvement in politics in the US and around the world has hurt Tesla's public image. It has also hurt investor confidence in Tesla. Tesla is seen as a good target by those unhappy with Musk because it is publicly traded, reliant on individual consumers, and Musk remains its largest shareholder. Some investors have called for Musk to step down from Tesla because his political activities are damaging the company.

Tesla has been targeted by anti-Musk groups like Everybody Hates Elon, Overthrow Musk, and Tesla Takedown UK. Anti-Musk groups have erected fake advertisements in the United Kingdom linking Tesla and Musk to the Nazis. Musk's controversial comments around antisemitism and the holocaust as well as his support for Alternative for Germany have hurt Tesla's image in Germany and across Europe.

Changing sentiments have led to animosity towards Tesla and Tesla owners in countries like Canada and Ukraine. Some Tesla owners have sold their cars in protest of Musk's political activities. In 2025 Mark Kelly sold his Tesla following a series of disputes with Elon Musk. American-Canadian Neil Young wrote and performed a song in which he extols the future of traditional automakers like Ford, GM, and Chrysler and features the line "If you're a fascist, get a Tesla."

Musk's DOGE significantly curtailed the US Department of Energy's Loan Programs Office which had given Tesla a critical $465 million loan to get the Model S into production leading to criticism that he was "pulling up the ladder" behind Tesla.

In March 2025 Tesla investor Christopher Tsai criticized how much time Musk was spending at the Department of Government Efficiency arguing that it was coming at the expense of Tesla.

Jeremy Clarkson criticised Musk and Tesla over the situation continuing a feud that started with a 2008 Top Gear review of a Tesla car, in addition Clarkson said "What makes it so juicy is that he's being pecked to death by the very people who put him on the pedestal in the first place. The eco hippies."

Tesla Chairwoman Robyn Denholm has ignored questions about whether Elon Musk's activities are having a negative impact on Tesla. In April 2025 the state treasurers of eight US states sent a joint letter to Tesla's board asking them to do a better job of supervising Musk.

== Environmental practices ==
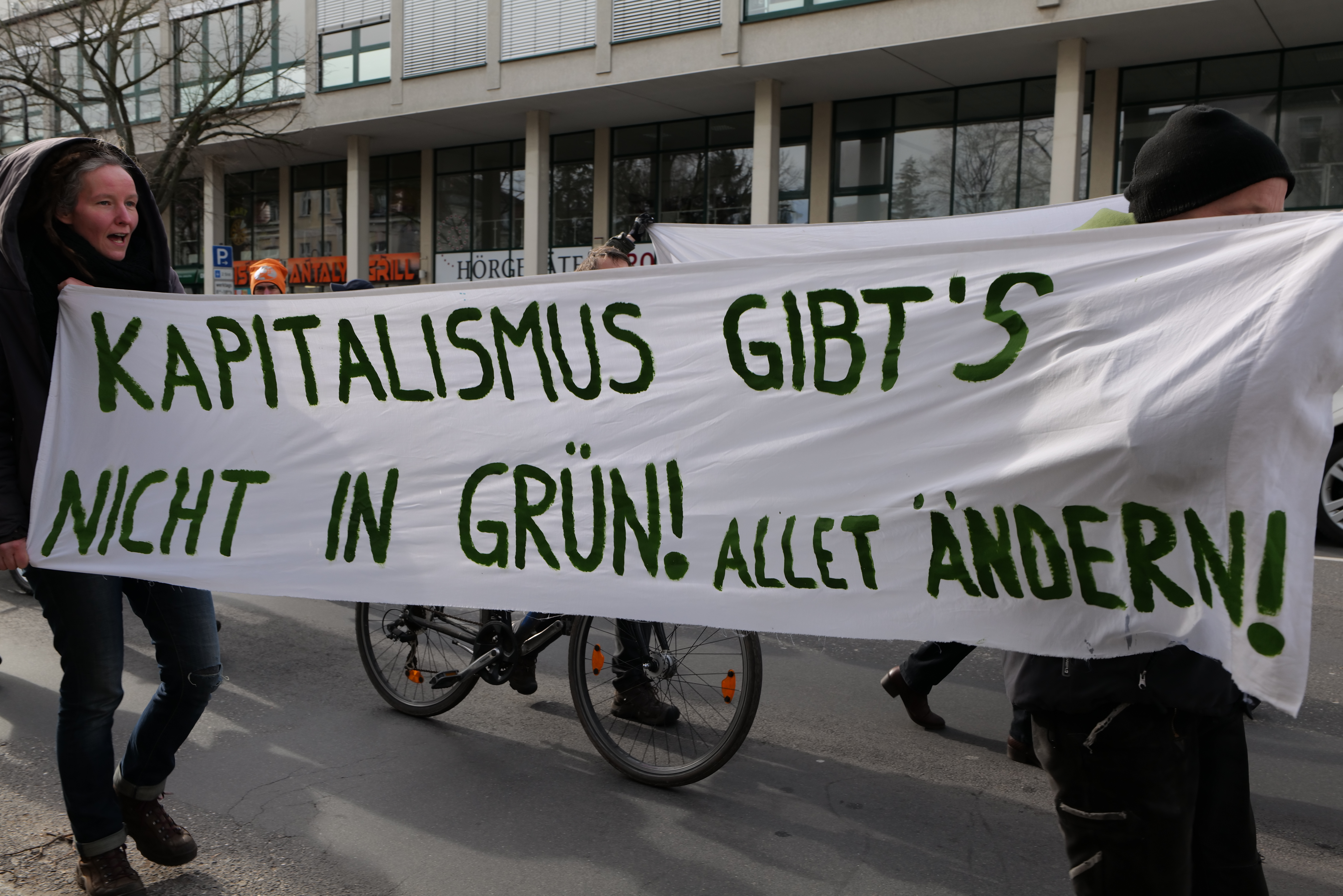
Protest against building a Tesla factory in Germany. Translation of the text: "Capitalism doesn't come in green! Change everything!"

In June 2019, Ed Niedermeyer reported that Tesla showed a pattern of "chronic noncompliance that stands in stark contrast to Tesla's public image as an environmental crusader" as related to air quality permits at Tesla's Fremont factory. Tesla repeatedly ignored air quality regulations, receiving notices from the Bay Area Air Quality Management District for 21 permit deviations.

Tesla launched its Supercharger network in 2012 with the promise that its stations would be solar-powered, and only in 2021 did Tesla state the network power was 100% renewable, but through solar power on-site and through purchasing electricity which was matched to renewable generation.

Tesla's 2018 impact report was criticized for not disclosing details on its emissions or electricity consumption, though emissions are rising as they expand in China and India. Tesla's 2021 impact report was criticized for not disclosing enough about how their operations affect the environment.

In May 2022, Tesla was removed from the S&P 500 ESG Index by S&P Dow Jones Indices, and in response, Elon Musk posted a tweet to his Twitter account criticizing the decision and, in noting that ExxonMobil was rated within the top 10 constituent companies in the index by weight, accused ESG of being a scam.

In January 2024, Tesla agreed to pay $1.3 million in civil penalties and $200,000 to reimburse investigation costs for the alleged illegal disposal of hazardous waste in 25 counties in California. Tesla also agreed to train its employees on hazardous waste disposal and to have 10 percent of Tesla's facilities audited for waste disposal for the next 5 years.

In May 2024, Tesla was sued by a nonprofit organization in the Northern California U.S. District Court for failure to comply with the Clean Air Act at its Fremont factory, while the Bay Area Air Quality Management District stated that the company has received 119 air pollution regulation violation notices since 2019 the previous month.

== Safety issues ==
=== Autopilot ===
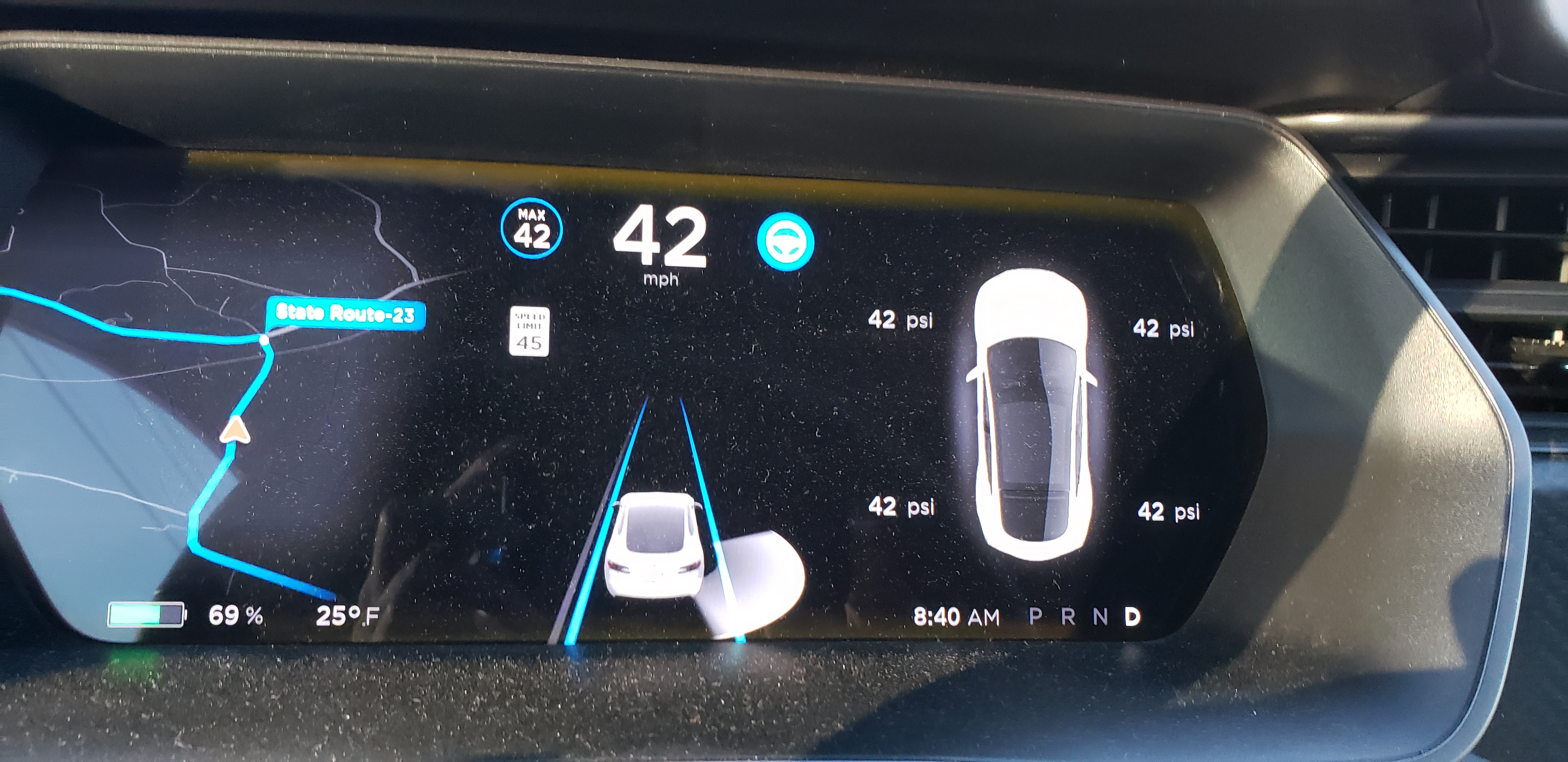
Tesla Autopilot interface

Tesla publishes safety reports saying that its cars have fewer crashes per mile with its Autopilot driver-assistance system engaged; critics argue that these figures are misleading, because Tesla does not release the underlying data and Autopilot is mostly used on highways, where crashes are less common. Tesla's "public beta" release of Autopilot has been called unsafe and irresponsible, as critical safety features are not thoroughly tested before being released to consumers. The National Transportation Safety Board has criticized Tesla for neglecting driver safety, calling certain Autopilot features "completely inadequate", and cited Autopilot as the probable cause of multiple deadly crashes involving Tesla vehicles. A 2019 study found that Autosteer increased the odds of airbag deployment by a factor of 2.4. A 2020 study found that drivers were more distracted when they used Autopilot, and the researchers called on Tesla to take more steps to ensure drivers stay attentive. Another 2020 study identified significant inconsistencies, abnormalities, and unsafe behavior with Autopilot on three Tesla Model 3 cars. Numerous videos have shown misuse and apparent malfunctions of Autopilot leading to collisions, and between 2016 and 2022 at least fifteen fatalities have involved the use of Autopilot, nine of which occurred in the United States.

The Center for Auto Safety and Consumer Watchdog have criticized Tesla for what they believe are deceptive marketing practices related to Autopilot. Studies by AAA and the Insurance Institute for Highway Safety have shown the name "Autopilot" to be misleading, causing drivers to think the system is safer than it actually is. A German court ruled in 2020 that Tesla had misled consumers by using the terms "Autopilot" and "Full Self Driving".

As of March 2021, the NHTSA was investigating 23 recent accidents involving Tesla vehicles that may have been on Autopilot. Tesla's Autopilot technology has struggled to detect crossing traffic and stopped vehicles, including stationary emergency vehicles, which has led to multiple fatal crashes. (Tesla released an "Emergency Light Detection" over-the-air update to Autopilot in September 2021, and the NHTSA questioned why it did not issue a recall.) Additionally, an MIT study published in September 2021 found that Tesla Autopilot is not as safe as it claims and leads to drivers becoming inattentive from regular use of the system.

In February 2022, NHTSA began an investigation of phantom braking at highway speeds after 354 complaints from customers concerning a group of about 416,000 Tesla vehicles. The complaints describe rapid deceleration that can occur repeatedly without warning and apparently at random. One owner of a 2021 Tesla Model Y reported a violent deceleration to the NHTSA from 80 mph to 69 mph in less than a second. In May 2022, the NHTSA said in a letter that they had received over 750 complaints about this issue.

In June 2022, NHTSA announced it was investigating 16 instances in which Autopilot shut off less than a second before a collision. Fortune suggested this "might indicate the system was designed to shut off when it sensed an imminent accident". Fortune also pointed out that Musk has frequently claimed that "accidents cannot be the fault of the company, as data it extracted invariably showed Autopilot was not active in the moment of the collision". Senator Ed Markey praised the NHTSA investigation, criticizing Tesla for disregarding safety rules and misleading the public about its "Autopilot" system. In April 2024, the NHTSA released the findings of its 3-year investigation of 956 vehicle collisions in which Tesla Autopilot was thought to have been in use that found that the system had contributed to at least 467 collisions including 13 that resulted in fatalities.

=== Full Self-Driving ===
Tesla has also been criticized by industry observers and safety advocates for its "fast-and-loose approach" to developing its automated-driving technology. Critics argue that pedestrians, cyclists, and other drivers did not sign up to take part in Tesla's "lab experiment" of testing Full Self Driving with amateur drivers on public roads. In July 2021, many videos surfaced showing dangerous behavior in Tesla vehicles using the latest version of the Full Self-Driving (FSD) beta add-on.

Tesla initially required all customers to sign a non-disclosure agreement (NDA) in order to take part in the FSD beta testing, which journalists noted as an attempt by Tesla to hide the system's flaws and protect itself from critics who argue that Tesla is actually making roads more dangerous. In response, the NHTSA sent a formal letter to Tesla asking about the terms of the NDA. Since then, videos of incidents from many beta testers have been posted online. Billionaire software safety advocate Dan O'Dowd aired a commercial claiming to show a Tesla running over child-sized mannequins several times; this generated a cease-and-desist letter from Tesla, which O'Dowd dismissed.

In August 2022, consumer rights activist Ralph Nader called on the NHTSA to outright remove FSD from all applicable Tesla cars. Vice and Consumer Reports also noted the poor implementation of Tesla's "Safety Score" measurement, which has led to drivers taking unsafe actions such as not braking for cyclists in the hopes of increasing their safety scores.

In February 2022, Tesla agreed to remove the "rolling stop" option from the add-on after the National Highway Traffic Safety Administration complained the practice is unsafe, and illegal everywhere in the United States.

In July 2024, The Washington Post reported on Musk's potentially fraudulent promises to customers regarding Full Self-Driving.

=== Fire risk ===
Leaked emails revealed that starting in 2012 Tesla knowingly sold Model S cars with a design flaw in its battery that could cause fires. Toyota ended their partnership with Tesla in 2014 in part because of disagreements about structural designs that could help prevent battery damage from road debris which could cause fires. Following a National Highway Traffic Safety Administration (NHTSA) investigation into two high-profile Tesla vehicle fires in 2014, Tesla added a titanium underbody shield to better protect the battery from road debris.

The NHTSA investigated Tesla in 2019 for allegedly issuing over-the-air updates to cover-up a non-crash fire risk in their batteries. In early 2021, Chinese regulators reprimanded Tesla after an increase in customer complaints about battery fires.

=== Sudden unintended acceleration ===
Over 200 incidents of sudden unintended acceleration in Tesla vehicles were reviewed by the NHTSA following a defect petition filed in December 2019. The investor who filed the defect petition said that the number of sudden unintended acceleration incidents involving Tesla vehicles was "astonishingly high" compared to other vehicles. The NHTSA concluded in January 2021 that the incidents were the result of user error, due to drivers confusing the brake and accelerator pedals.

In June 2021, Chinese regulators announced that Tesla would recall nearly 300,000 China-made and imported Model 3 and Model Y cars due to an assisted driving function that could be activated accidentally, causing sudden unintended acceleration.

On April 17, 2024, the National Highway Traffic Safety Administration announced that Tesla had issued a recall on all 3,878 Cybertrucks due to an issue where the accelerator pedal pad would dislodge and cause the pedal to become stuck in the interior trim.

=== Brake failures ===
In March 2021, the owner of a new Model 3 in China reported an accident that she believed was caused by a brake failure; a Tesla China technician reproduced the accident at the same location. Tesla China later issued a statement saying that both the customer's and the technician's cars showed no signs of any malfunction.

In April 2021, an angry Tesla owner protested atop a Tesla Model 3 at the Shanghai Auto Show, repeatedly yelling "Tesla brake lost control". The woman says that the brakes on her Tesla Model 3 failed, nearly killing four of her family members in an accident. Tesla China disputed the claim, saying the car's brakes and emergency-warning system functioned properly.

=== Stealth recalls ===
Tesla has been accused of performing "stealth recalls" by labeling safety-critical repairs as "goodwill", while also requiring customers to sign non-disclosure agreements. Journalist and author Ed Niedermeyer called this type of agreement "unheard of in the auto industry", and noted that a policy of demanding non-disclosure agreements for "goodwill" repairs would limit the number of defects Tesla owners reported to the NHTSA. The NHTSA stated they were aware that Tesla had entered into a "troublesome" non-disclosure agreement with one Model S owner regarding a failed suspension.

=== Misleading safety ratings ===
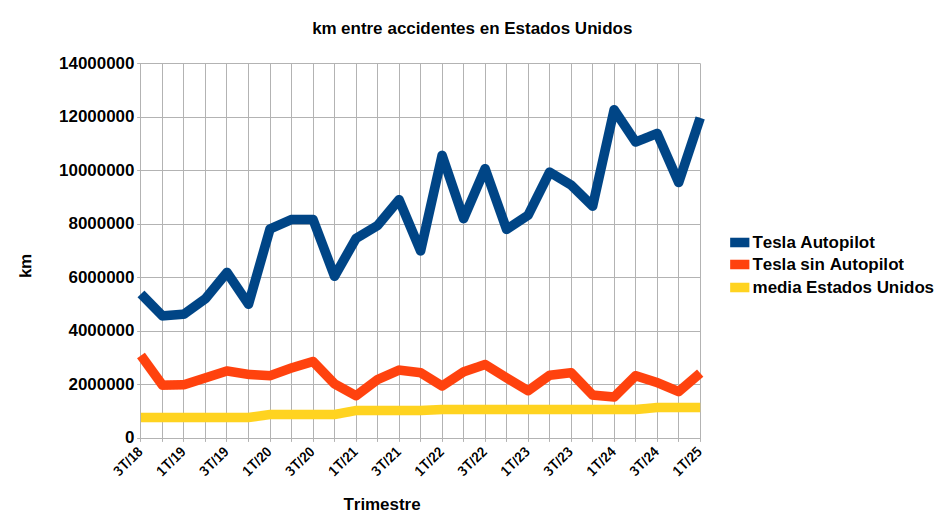
A graph of Tesla's often cited statistic of kilometer per crash

In 2013, the NHTSA awarded the original Tesla Model S its maximum safety rating of five stars. Tesla subsequently claimed that - based on the details of the test - it actually achieved 5.4 stars, prompting the NHTSA to release a statement reaffirming that it does not award more than five stars, and that Tesla was "misleading the public" by claiming in their marketing that the NHTSA had awarded them a higher rating.

In 2017, the Insurance Institute for Highway Safety (IIHS) awarded the Model S their second-highest rating of "acceptable," denying the Model S a "Top Safety Pick" rating due to less than satisfactory results in a frontal overlap crash test of the vehicle and its "poor" headlights. Tesla responded by accusing groups like the IIHS of using methods "that suit their own subjective purposes", and dismissed the results by claiming that the Model S and Model X were "the safest cars in history" based on the NHTSA's older and less comprehensive tests. Reporters noted Tesla's dismissiveness of potential safety concerns, calling it "irresponsible" and "ridiculous."

In 2018, after the Tesla Model 3 was awarded a five-star rating by the NHTSA, Tesla claimed that the Model 3 had "the lowest probability of injury of any vehicle ever tested by NHTSA," prompting the NHTSA to publish a statement that it does not rank vehicles within the five-star category. In 2019, documents acquired by PlainSite revealed that the NHTSA had sent Elon Musk a cease and desist letter in response to this and several other "deceptive" and "inaccurate" statements about the NHTSA's ratings which were made by Tesla and promoted on social media by Musk. The NHTSA then referred the matter to the U.S. Federal Trade Commission's Bureau of Consumer Protection for further investigation.

=== "Whompy wheels" ===
Starting in 2015, many Tesla drivers have complained about "whompy wheels"—an issue where the car's suspension system breaks, sometimes causing a wheel to collapse or fall off the car. NHTSA announced it was investigating Model S suspension issues in 2016, seeking input from the company and Tesla owners after receiving multiple reports of possible suspension failures. In addition, NHTSA stated it was concerned that Tesla asked owners to sign nondisclosure agreements covering repairs for safety issues; a spokesperson for NHTSA stated "The agency immediately informed Tesla that any language implying that consumers should not contact the agency regarding safety concerns is unacceptable, and N.H.T.S.A. expects Tesla to eliminate any such language." Tesla disputed the characterization of NHTSA's actions as an investigation, calling it a "routine screening" instead and questioning whether the reporter, Edward Niedermeyer, had financial motivations. The 2016 probe was closed without further action.

Rather than issue a recall on potentially defective suspensions, Tesla has released multiple technical service bulletins warning mechanics about suspension issues and in some cases, advising replacement. For example, Tesla issued SB-17-31-001 in February 2017, which stated "Some Model S and Model X vehicles may have been manufactured with front suspension fore links that may not meet Tesla strength specifications", calling for those links to be replaced as the remedy. Some of the additional bulletins advising inspection and replacement include SB-17-31-002 (front stabilizer bar links, 2017 Models S and X), SB-17-31-006 (front suspension lower fore links, 2016 Models S and X in China), SB-18-31-002 (front upper control arms, 2017 Model 3), SB-18-31-005 (front stabilizer bar links, 2017–18 Model 3), and SB-19-31-001 (lower rear control arm assemblies, 2013–14 Model S).

During a twelve-month period ending in April 2019, Tesla spent $4 million globally on warranty repairs to Model S and X suspensions, of which the plurality ($1.3 M) was attributed to front suspension aft links. Based on data reported internally by a Tesla engineer in September 2020, Reuters calculated that approximately 5% of all Tesla Model S and X vehicles in southern Europe and the Middle East had required aft link repairs. In October 2020, Chinese authorities forced Tesla to recall 30,000 Model S and X cars due to suspension issues. Tesla stated the recall in China for the front suspension aft link and rear suspension upper link was to avoid "a heavy burden through the Chinese administrative process" but "there is no defect in the subject components and no associated safety-risk", reporting the root cause was "driver abuse, including that driver usage and expectation for damageability is uniquely severe in the China market" and citing the overall low incidence of failures, both in China (0.1%) and elsewhere (<0.05%). However, internal records show the front suspension aft link was redesigned four times between 2016 and 2020 while Tesla was resolving 400 complaints about aft link failures in China. In December 2020, NHTSA opened a preliminary evaluation (PE20-020) in response to 53 complaints alleging that front fore links fractured at the steering knuckle ball joint attachment for certain years of Model S (2015–2017) and Model X (2016–2017) vehicles, which were the parts covered by SB-17-31-001, issued in 2017.

A lawsuit was filed against Tesla in 2022, alleging that after the suspension failed on a 2021 Model 3, the vehicle's undercarriage impacted the roadway, igniting the batteries; after colliding with trees, the driver and passenger died.

In December 2023, Reuters published an investigative article showing that Tesla had dismissed prior customer claims for suspension and steering failures as resulting from prior damage or driver abuse, while internally documenting the same parts with chronic failures as flawed.

=== Passenger Play ===
In December 2021, National Highway Traffic Safety Administration opened an investigation into Tesla's Passenger Play feature, which allowed riders to play games on the car's touchscreen even while the vehicle was in motion. The agency's inquiry included four models - S, X, Y and 3. A day after the investigation was officially launched, Tesla responded with an over-the-air update that disabled Passenger Play for vehicles in motion and making it only accessible while the car is parked. However, NHTSA stated it will continue with the investigation.

== Quality issues ==
Many critics, including Consumer Reports, J.D. Power, and What Car?, have noted the questionable quality and poor reliability of Tesla cars. For 2021, Consumer Reports rated Tesla's overall reliability as 27th worst out of 28 car brands. For 2022, Consumer Reports expects the reliability of the Model 3 to be average, and the Model S, X, and Y to be below average.

Tesla used non-automotive grade materials in their 2012 and later Model S infotainment screens in order to have the largest car screen on the market, but they distorted over time. Tesla skipped pre-production testing before the Model 3 launch in 2017, which other major auto manufacturers consider a crucial part of the quality control process. Tesla's production of the Model 3 was criticized in 2018 for producing an abnormally high ratio of flawed vehicles and parts. Jonathon Klein, reporting for The Drive, argued in 2019 that many of Tesla's quality problems stem from their cars being "rushed to market". For example, Tesla skipped a critical brake-and-roll test and reduced the number of welds on the Model 3 in order to meet quarterly production targets in 2018. Tesla vehicles have experienced noteworthy issues such as the roof detaching while driving on the highway in 2020. In September 2020, Model Y owners reported finding its cooling system to be held together with a "band-aid" of tape and faux wood. One manufacturing engineer in 2021 called an issue with Tesla vehicles having loose or missing suspension bolts "especially scary", since it indicates that Tesla does not have proper preventative measures in place to make sure parts are not missing. In early 2023, the steering wheel of a brand new Tesla fell off during driving, closely reflecting a similar case from 2020. Chinese regulators rebuked Tesla in early 2021, urging them to strengthen their internal management in order to improve quality control after growing consumer complaints amidst Tesla's rapid sales expansion in China.

Recalls have become a recurring matter for the company as well: In February 2021, Tesla was forced to recall 135,000 Model S and Model X vehicles built between 2012 and 2018 due to using a flash memory device that was only rated to last five to six years and, between November 2021 and February 2022, there were eight recalls across models for various issues (some involving safety concerns).

=== Battery throttling ===
In August 2019, a class action lawsuit was filed in Northern California, claiming that a 2019 over-the-air software update throttled the Model S battery life, some by as much as 40 miles. On December 7, 2020, Tesla settled the suit for $1.5 million.

In April 2021, a Norwegian judge found Tesla guilty of throttling charging speed in a similar suit, after they failed to respond to the lawsuit. The 30 customers who were part of the lawsuit were awarded 136,000 Norwegian kroner each ($16,000).

=== German Technical Inspection Association 2022 Report ===
In the 2022 the German Technical Inspection Association (Technischer Überwachungsverein or TÜV) evaluated passenger cars whose main inspections took place between July 2020 and June 2021, and did its first-ever evaluation of the four most popular electric cars in Germany, with their defect rates:

Electric Car	# of Samples	Defect Rate	Compared to ICE cars
Smart Fortwo Electric Drive	1645	3.5%	Top third
BMW i3	1142	4.7%	Middle third
Renault Zoe	1939	5.7%	Bottom third
Tesla Model S	812	10.7%	Bottom third

With a defect rate of 10.7 percent, every tenth Tesla Model S failed the inspection and the Model S would end up in the bottom third of the 128 internal combustion engine (ICE) cars TÜV evaluated. The General German Automobile Club states the average defect rate for 2-3 year-old ICE cars is 4.7 percent.

== Customer service issues ==
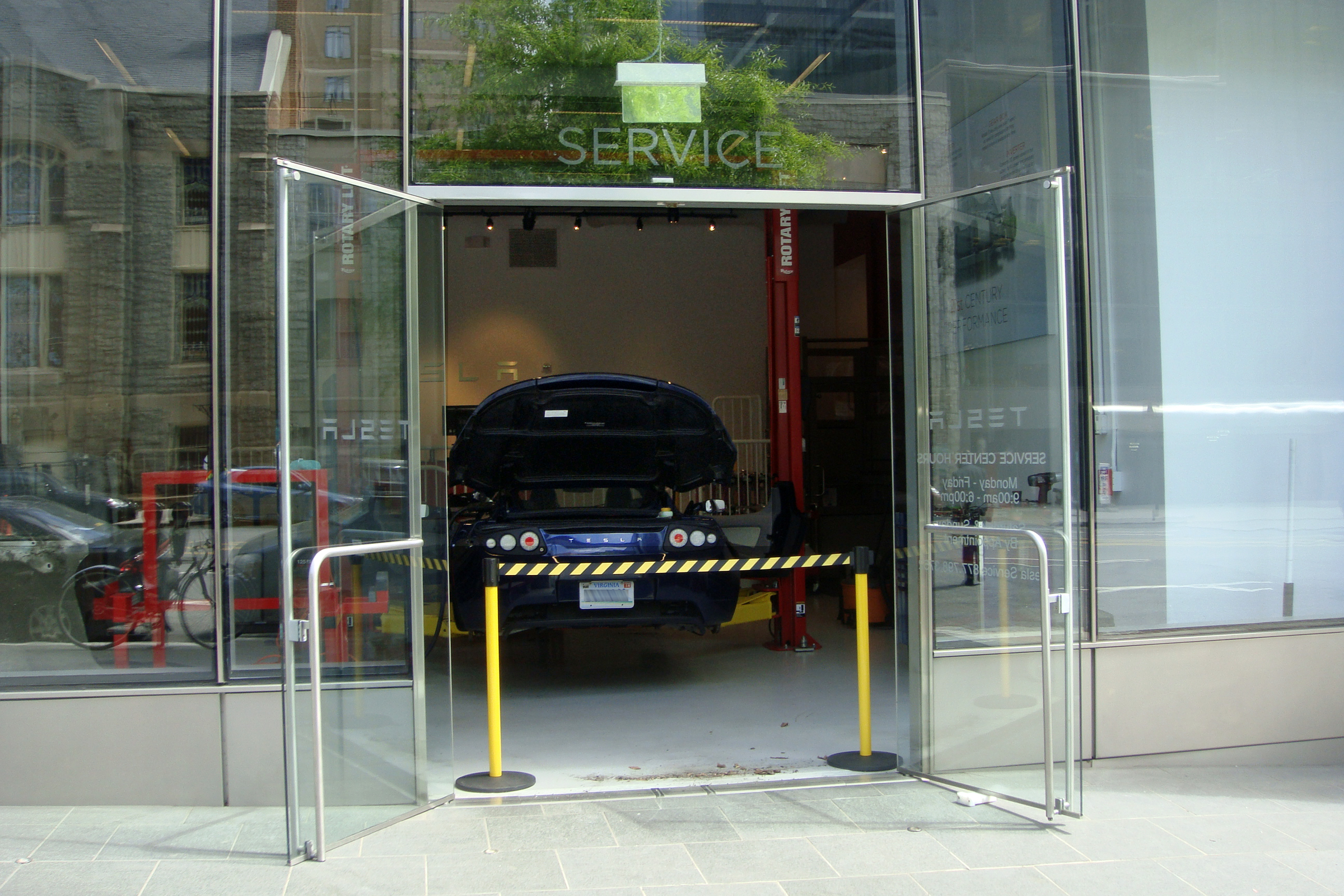
A Tesla service facility

In 2017, certain Tesla vehicles equipped with its Ludicrous performance mode had limited power output, as discovered by some Tesla owners in 2017. The power limits were connected to how frequently the drivers used Launch Mode; if a driver used it too much, the car's power output was restricted to prevent excessive wear and tear on components. Customers complained and the company removed the limiter.

Tesla owners complained in 2019 about "nightmarish" repair delays, with some car owners waiting upwards of six months for repairs due to long wait-times for parts and insufficient service centers. Customers also complained in 2019 about their inability to contact a human employee for service issues. Tesla has pushed customers to book service appointments via their mobile app, which one owner called a "black hole" in 2019. Customers complained in 2019 about Tesla being sloppy and inconsistent in handling returns and refunds, with some customers waiting months to receive refunds. In March 2021, Tesla double-charged some customers for new cars; about a week after significant public outcry, Tesla apologized and the customers received refunds.

In early 2020, Tesla was criticized by Chinese publications and individuals for delivering Model 3 cars with lower-performance Autopilot hardware than promised. Specifically, Tesla's Hardware Version 3.0 for Autopilot had been cited as being included when buyers bought the vehicles, but, upon closer examination, the new owners said the cars featured only Version 2.5 of the hardware.

In February 2020, Tesla drew criticism after removing Enhanced Autopilot and Full Self Driving Capability on a Model S after a customer bought the car from a reseller, despite the third-party dealer having already paid for the feature.

In July 2023, Reuters reported that Tesla had created a special "diversion team" in 2022 to cancel service appointments related to driving range issues. Approximately 10 years prior, the Tesla in-car range estimation algorithm was adjusted to provide an optimistic forecast when the battery state of charge was greater than 50%, switching to a more realistic forecast below 50%, and included an additional "safety buffer" range of approximately 15 mi (24 km) when the state of charge was 0%. Recurrent Auto, a third-party battery monitoring company, noted the average Tesla Model Y in-car estimated range remained at approximately 90% of EPA estimate regardless of ambient temperature, while real-world measured range was 45-60% of the EPA estimate. In a test published by SAE International in April 2023, three Tesla models averaged 26% lower range than advertised. Diversion team members were told to run remote diagnostics on owner vehicles, provide driving tips to maximize range, and explain the range values were estimates, not measurements. In early August, several Tesla owners filed suit over the alleged range inflation.

=== Solar Roof lawsuit ===
In February 2022, Solar Roof customers sued Tesla for alleged sudden price increases and repeated delays in the solar panel installations, leading to 6,300 customers cancelling their contracts. In June 2023, Tesla settled with the customers for $6 million.

== Data privacy concerns ==
Tesla was only the second product ever reviewed by the Mozilla Foundation which violated all of their privacy concerns.

A Tesla owner filed a lawsuit in 2023 following a Reuters report that Tesla employees shared "highly invasive videos and images recorded by customers' car cameras" with one another.

Internal data troves shared with various international government agencies and news organizations by former employee and whistleblower Lukasz Krupski in late 2023 implicated Tesla in "serious data protection lapse[s]." The data Krupski retrieved included "information about current and former Tesla staff, including passport numbers, medical details and salaries" and was readily available on internal systems that most employees had access to. As of November 2023, the Data Protection Authority in the Netherlands is investigating whether this alleged lack of internal security violated privacy laws.

== Relations with the government of China ==
Tesla has received special treatment and strong support by the government of the People's Republic of China, gaining perks such as tax breaks, cheap financing, the ability to wholly own its Chinese operations, and assistance in building its Shanghai factory (Giga Shanghai) at breakneck speed. During the COVID-19 pandemic, according to Bloomberg, one Tesla executive said, "Tesla didn't just have a green light from the government to get back to work—it had a flashing-sirens police escort."

Musk has frequently praised China, a controversial stance due to deteriorating U.S.–Chinese relations, China's ongoing persecution of Uyghurs, and alleged human rights abuses in Hong Kong. After Gigafactory Shanghai produced its first batch of vehicles, Musk thanked the Chinese government and Chinese people while criticizing the United States and its people. James McGregor, chairman for Greater China at APCO Worldwide, said that foreign companies in China under Chinese Communist Party general secretary Xi Jinping need to "be aware that the ultimate plan is for all the advanced technologies to be Chinese." McGregor added, "I hope that Elon is going in there with both eyes open."

In August 2020, Congressional negotiators (led by then-U.S. Senator Cory Gardner) highlighted Tesla's ties to China as a potential national security risk for the United States.

In July 2021, Bloomberg Businessweek reported on Tesla's "fall from grace" in China due to data collection and safety issues. Tesla reportedly asked the Chinese government to censor criticism of Tesla on social media.

In January 2022, the Council on American–Islamic Relations, Senator Marco Rubio, and others urged Tesla to close its showroom in Ürümqi, Xinjiang, due to the Persecution of Uyghurs in China in the Xinjiang region.

In December 2024, US Representative Rosa DeLauro declared that Musk had pressured House Republicans to remove a restriction on investment in China from a bipartisan government funding bill. Musk responded that DeLauro was an "awful creature" who "needs to be expelled from Congress."

== Working conditions ==
In 2017, The Guardian published a story about working conditions at Tesla Fremont, in which former and current Tesla employees publicly expressed concerns about worker treatment. Between 2014 and 2017, ambulances went to Tesla Fremont over 100 times to provide emergency services to workers exhibiting symptoms including fainting, dizziness, abnormal breathing and chest pains resulting from the physically demanding tasks associated with their positions. At the end of that period, Tesla Fremont employed over 10,000 workers.

=== Underreported Total Recordable Incident Rate ===
Tesla has acknowledged that its Total Recordable Incident Rate (TRIR, a measure of employee safety) exceeded the industry average between 2013 and 2016. Tesla did not release exact data over that period, claiming it is not representative of the factory's current operations. Musk defended Tesla's safety record and argued that the company had made significant improvement; in early 2017, Tesla added extra shifts and safety teams to improve conditions. However, when The Guardian reached out in 2017 to 15 current or former workers, each contradicted Musk's viewpoint. Jonathan Galescu, a production technician for the company, said, "I've seen people pass out, hit the floor like a pancake and smash their face open. They just send us to work around him while he's still laying on the floor." In February 2017, Jose Moran, a Tesla worker, blogged about the company's practices of mandatory overtime, frequent worker injuries and low wages. Both workers are involved with the United Auto Workers (UAW)'s current organizing campaign.

In 2018, The Center for Investigative Reporting's Reveal published an investigation concluding that Tesla under-counted worker injuries to make its safety record appear better. It included findings such as the factory floor not having clearly marked pedestrian lanes and instead having lanes painted different shades of gray because Elon Musk does not like the color yellow. In addition, other safety signals (such as signs and warning beeps) were lowered in order to please Musk's aesthetic preferences. Susan Rigmaiden, former environmental compliance manager, commented: "If someone said, 'Elon doesn't like something,' you were concerned because you could lose your job." Tesla called Reveal's investigation an "ideologically motivated attack by an extremist organization working directly with union supporters to create a calculated disinformation campaign against Tesla." Reveal responded by publishing the details of their investigation, which included interviews of more than three dozen current and former employees and managers as well as the review of hundreds of pages of documents. Additionally, many of the interviewed safety professionals had no involvement in a unionization effort. A California regulator (Cal/OSHA) confirmed the 2018 under-reporting and stated that including those injuries would raise Tesla's 2018 TRIR from 6.2 to 6.5, compared to the automobile manufacturing average of 6.1.

=== Injury policies criticized ===
Tesla's policies for dealing with injured employees has been criticized. In 2017, workers alleged that Tesla's policies got in the way of workers reporting injuries. At Tesla, workers who reported injuries were moved to lighter work and also lower pay, while also being given access to supplemental insurance benefits. One injured worker reported that his pay went from $22 an hour to $10 an hour. To protect their incomes, many workers choose to work during their recovery from injury, in some cases causing further damage and pain.

=== Anti-union efforts ===
A California judge ruled in September 2019 that Tesla and Elon Musk had illegally sabotaged employee efforts to form a union. Union organizers voiced concerns about high injury rates and low wages. Organizers were illegally harassed by Tesla security guards, threatened with losing benefits such as stock options, and warned by supervisors that they could be fired. Tesla fired one employee, Richard Ortiz, who had been active in union organization efforts. In May 2021, the National Labor Relations Board (NLRB) upheld the 2019 court ruling, ordering that Ortiz be reinstated with back pay and that Musk delete an anti-union tweet. Tesla later appealed and a federal appeals court sided with the original decision.

In April 2022, the NLRB ruled that Tesla's dress code, which prohibited workers from wearing union logos or insignia, was unlawful, although in November 2023 the United States Court of Appeals for the Fifth Circuit overturned the NLRB's ruling.

In June 2022, a CNBC report found that Tesla paid MikeWorldWide to monitor a Tesla employee Facebook group and to conduct research on Tesla union organizers on social media from 2017 to 2018. MikeWorldWide monitored discussions on social networks alleging unfair labor practices at Tesla and monitored discussions on a sexual harassment lawsuit. Former and current Tesla employees told CNBC that they believe the company continues to monitor its workers on social media.

In December 2022, two Tesla workers filed complaints with the NLRB accusing the company of illegally firing them in retaliation for criticizing the company's CEO, Elon Musk, in violation of federal laws protecting speech about working conditions.

In February 2023, a group of workers at a Tesla factory in Buffalo, New York, dubbed Gigafactory 2, filed an injunction with the NLRB, accusing the automaker of firing more than 30 workers from the company's Autopilot unit "in retaliation for union activity and to discourage union activity." The company, however, denied the allegations, and the complaint was dismissed by the NLRB in November 2023.

In April 2023, the NLRB ruled that Tesla violated labor law by prohibiting workers at an Orlando, Florida service center from discussing pay or raising grievances about working conditions with upper management.

In May 2024, pursuant to allegations raised by Workers United, the NLRB regional director in Buffalo, New York filed a complaint with the national board alleging that Tesla had implemented company policies to prevent workers at its Buffalo assembly plant from unionizing in violation of the National Labor Relations Act of 1935.

=== Child labor in supply chain ===
In 2019, IRAdvocates, a US-based NGO filed a class-action lawsuit against five large technology companies including Tesla for "aiding and abetting the use of young children in the Democratic Republic of Congo (DRC) cobalt mining industry." In 2020, The Times cited Tesla's dependence on cobalt from the DRC in their lithium-ion car batteries, which have been called "blood batteries" due to incidents of child labor and extremely poor working conditions. Tesla stated in 2020 that it is moving to cobalt-free batteries, without giving a timeline. In the January–March 2022 quarter, half of Tesla's car batteries were cobalt-free. The 2022 Tesla Impact Report reports that "Tesla's cell production growth rate will increase our demand for primary mined minerals", which includes cobalt.

=== Sweatshop conditions ===
In December 2020, PingWest highlighted poor working conditions at Giga Shanghai, calling it "Giga-Sweatshop". Employees reported being "crammed into tight workspace", intense manual labor, and office bullying. Many employees at Giga Shanghai quit after Tesla cancelled employee stock options and failed to keep its promise of paying an overtime allowance.

The working conditions at Tesla's Fremont factory were criticized in 2021 by former Tesla worker Dennis Duran, who called it a "modern-day industrial sweatshop".

=== COVID-19 pandemic ===
Tesla's initial response to the COVID-19 pandemic in the United States has been the subject of considerable criticism. Musk had sought to exempt the Tesla Fremont factory in Alameda County, California from the government's stay-at-home orders. In an earnings call in April, he was heard calling the public health orders "fascist". He had also called the public's response to the pandemic "dumb" and had said online that there would be zero cases by April. In May 2020, while Alameda County officials were negotiating with the company to reopen the Fremont Factory on the 18th, Musk defied local government orders by restarting production on the 11th. Tesla also sued Alameda County, questioning the legality of the orders, but backed down after the Fremont Factory was given approval to reopen. In June 2020, Tesla published a detailed plan for bringing employees back to work and keeping them safe, however some employees still expressed concern for their health.

In May 2020, Musk told workers that they could stay home if they felt uncomfortable coming back to work. But in June, Tesla fired an employee who criticized the company for taking inadequate safety measures to protect workers from the coronavirus at the Fremont Factory. Three more employees at Tesla's Fremont Factory claimed they were fired for staying home out of fear of catching COVID-19. This was subsequently denied by Tesla, which even stated that the employees were still on the payroll. COVID-19 cases at the factory grew from 10 in May 2020 to 125 in December 2020, with about 450 total cases in that time period out of the approximately 10,000 workers at the plant (4.5%).

== Workplace culture issues ==
=== Racism and harassment ===
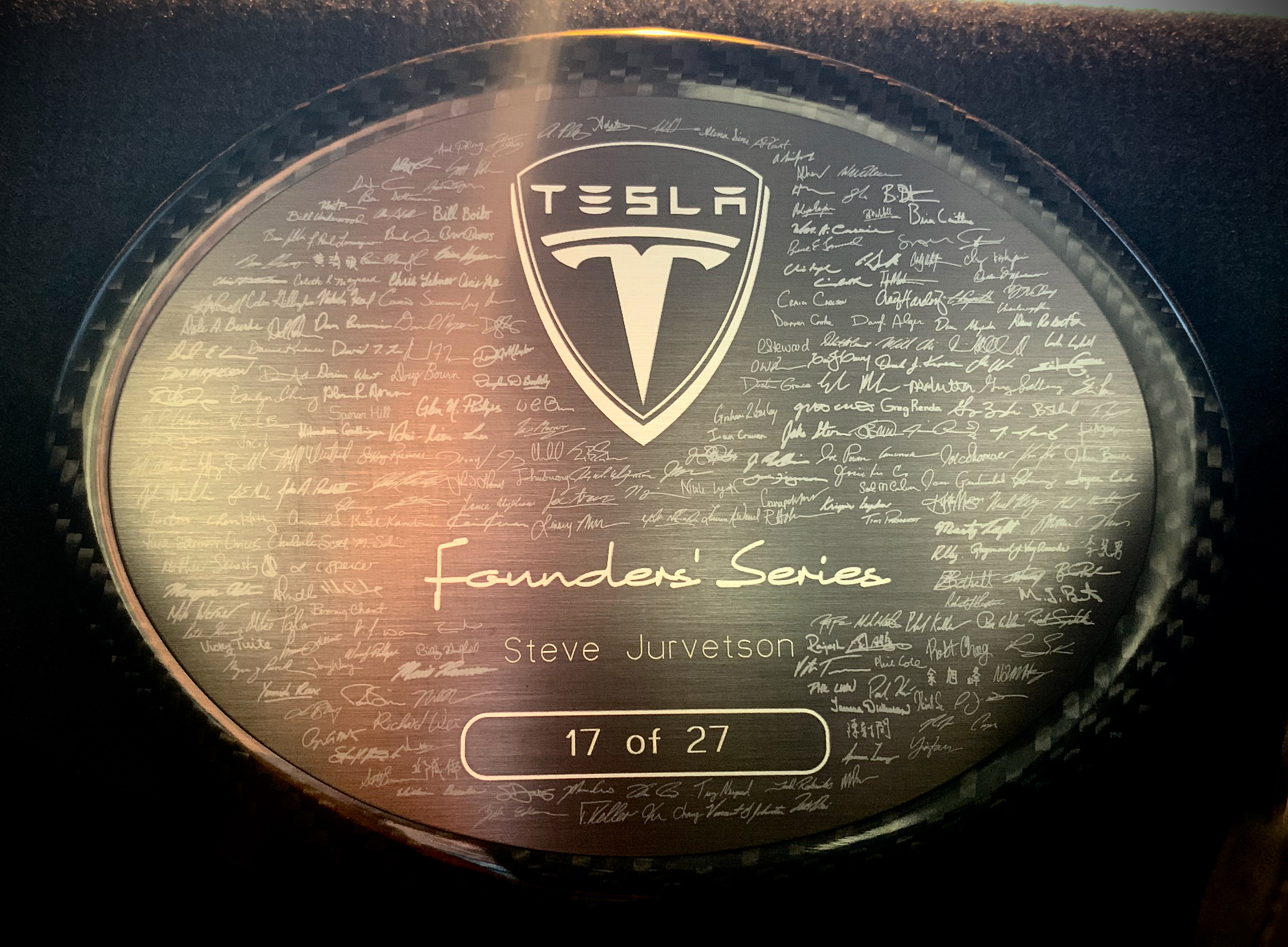
Signatures of early Tesla employees on the company's 17th car badge

Tesla has faced numerous complaints over workplace harassment and racial discrimination, with one former Tesla worker who attempted to sue the employer describing it as "a hotbed of racist behavior". As of December 2020, only four percent of leadership at the company are African American and seventeen percent are women. A former black worker described the work environment at Tesla's Buffalo plant as a "very racist place". Tesla and SpaceX's treatment of Juneteenth in 2020 also came under fire.

Approximately 100 former employees have submitted signed statements alleging that Tesla discriminates specifically against African Americans and "allows a racist environment in its factories." Furthermore, in July 2021, former employee Melvin Berry received $1 million in his discrimination case in arbitration against Tesla after he claimed he was referred to by the N-word and forced to work longer hours at the Fremont plant. In April 2023, a jury found Tesla liable for the racial harassment of Owen Diaz at its Fremont facility during 2015–2016 and awarded $175,000 in damages for emotional distress, and $3 million in punitive damages.

The accusations of racism culminated in February 2022 with the California Department of Fair Employment and Housing (DFEH) suing Tesla for "discriminating against its Black workers." A further lawsuit regarding racism was raised by fifteen former and current employees in June 2022. In April 2022, Tesla lawyers stated in a legal filing that the Equal Employment Opportunity Commission (EEOC) had opened an investigation into Tesla before the DFEH 2019 investigation, and in July 2022, Tesla stated in its 10-Q filing that the EEOC had issued a cause finding against the company and that Tesla would engage in a mandatory conciliation process with the EEOC. In September 2023, the EEOC sued Tesla in the Northern California U.S. District Court for permitting widespread racist harassment of black workers at its California factory and for retaliating against black workers for opposing the company's conduct.

=== Sexual harassment ===
In 2017, a woman accused Tesla of workplace sexual harassment and was subsequently fired. Her lawsuit was dismissed with prejudice in 2019.

In 2021, seven women came forward with claims of having faced sexual harassment and discrimination while working at Tesla's Fremont factory. They accused the company of facilitating a culture of rampant sexual harassment. According to their filings and subsequent interviews, the women were consistently subjected to catcalling, unwanted advances, unwanted touching, and discrimination while at work. One of the seven, Brooks, told The Washington Post that "I was so tired of the unwanted attention and the males gawking at me I proceeded to create barriers around me just so I could get some relief" and "[t]hat was something I felt necessary just so I can do my job." Their stories range from intimate groping to being called out to the parking lot for sex. Each of the women feared calling Human Resources for help as their supervisors were often participants. Musk himself is not accused directly, but most of the women pressing charges believe their abuse is connected to the behavior of CEO Musk. Jessica Barraza, a Tesla production associate who filed a lawsuit for sexual harassment incidents, corroborated by The Washington Post, said that Tesla's male-majority workplace culture—described in the lawsuit as resembling an archaic construction site or frat house, with frequent groping on the factory floor—is bred at the top of the company; she cited Musk's "tits" tweet as setting an example for workers at the Tesla factory that is unfair to women who work there. Attorney David A. Lowe, the legal representative of six employees suing Tesla, stated, "What we're addressing for each of the lawsuits is just a shocking pattern of rampant harassment that exists at Tesla".

=== Musk's work behavior ===
Musk has been criticized for his erratic behavior. The Wall Street Journal reported in 2017 that, after Musk insisted on branding his vehicles as "self-driving", he faced criticism from his engineers, some of them resigning in response, and one highlighting Musk's "reckless decision making that has potentially put customer lives at risk". In 2018, Tesla board members expressed concern regarding Musk's use of Ambien and recreational drugs. Wired noted in 2018 that Musk was known amongst employees for his "unpredictable rages", and Tesla employees were warned not to walk past Musk's desk because he was so prone to unexpectedly firing people. Ex-employees said in 2019 that Musk would change the direction of the company "literally overnight" based on what was making news on social media. Several professors in 2018 and 2019 noted Musk's narcissistic tendencies, and the problems this could cause for Tesla.

=== Turnover rate ===
Tesla has been criticized for its high level of executive turnover compared to other technology companies. With the departure of William Berry in March 2022, Tesla had five general counsel departures since 2018. Several lower level lawyers in the company, such as deputy general counsels, have also left in 2021 and 2022. Tesla has also seen considerable personnel turn-over in the roles of Chief Accounting Officer and Chief Financial Officer, as well as lead Autopilot roles. Four top executives left Tesla in the days preceding the company's "robotaxi" event in October 2024, with senior staff saying that "a lot of people at Tesla are just tired of all the noise" and that CEO Elon Musk had lost focus on the company.

== Whistleblower allegations and retaliation ==
In June 2018, Martin Tripp, a former employee at Giga Nevada, leaked documents to Business Insider that indicated Tesla was generating excessive amounts of waste and scrap material, which cost Tesla nearly $150 million for the first half of 2018. According to Bloomberg, after determining that Tripp was the source of this leak, Elon Musk set out to "destroy" him. A former Tesla security manager, Sean Gouthro, described a months-long campaign by Tesla to "hound" and harass Tripp, including hacking into Tripp's phone and having him followed by investigators. On June 20, the same day that Tesla sued Tripp for $167 million, an anonymous caller contacted Tesla and claimed that Tripp was planning a mass shooting at the Gigafactory. Police found Tripp unarmed and determined the threat was not credible; Tripp suggested the fake tip may have been made by Musk himself. The court ruled in Tesla's favor on September 17, 2020, though questions remain about the wasted materials and why they were left unaccounted for in corporate reports.

Also in June 2018, a former high-level safety official at Tesla named Carlos Ramirez sued the company for failing to treat injured workers and misclassifying worker injuries to avoid reporting them to authorities. Ramirez alleged that he was fired by Tesla in retaliation for raising concerns about these practices. As of August 2022, the case is unresolved.

In August 2018, a former Tesla employee named Karl Hansen filed a whistleblower complaint with the SEC alleging that Tesla failed to disclose an alleged drug trafficking ring at the Nevada Gigafactory "involving the sale of significant quantities of cocaine and possibly crystal methamphetamine" for a Mexican drug cartel. Hansen also accused Tesla of spying on employees and hiding the theft of $37 million worth of copper and other raw materials. Hansen alleged that he was retaliated against and wrongfully terminated by Tesla for raising these issues internally. In 2019, Hansen filed a lawsuit related to these allegations; in 2020, the case was ordered to arbitration. In June 2022, the arbitrator filed an unopposed motion with the court stating Hansen "has failed to establish the claims...Accordingly his claims are denied, and he shall take nothing". In 2019, former factory supervisor Lynn Thompson also sued Tesla for terminating his security contract after he reported the same theft to local authorities. Thompson said that Elon Musk and other high-level company executives met to discuss the thefts. In 2020, the case lawsuit was stayed pending arbitration.

In November 2020, a former Tesla employee named Steven Henkes filed a lawsuit alleging he was fired by Tesla in retaliation for raising safety concerns about "unacceptable fire risks" in the company's solar installations. Tesla solar installations have caught fire at seven Walmart locations, as well as an Amazon warehouse and Tesla attempted to correct some installations in secret. As of August 2022, the case is unresolved.

== Relationship with the media industry ==
Musk has openly criticized the media while Tesla famously dissolved its public relations department in 2020.

=== Distracting from bad news ===
Reporter Michael Hiltzik has argued that Musk has a habit of promoting good news "relentlessly" about Tesla and himself, while creating sideshows to distract followers away from any bad news. In particular, Hiltzik pointed out that Tesla's announcement in February 2021 that it was investing $1.5 billion in Bitcoin coincided with news that the Chinese government had rebuked Tesla for poor quality control and consumer relations in China, as well as a report that the company's German factory (Giga Berlin) was facing construction delays and reduced government subsidies. Similarly, in July 2018, Bloomberg News reported that Elon Musk enlisted the help of the head of the Sierra Club specifically to deflect criticism over his donations to Republicans.

=== Dispute over facts ===
Musk has repeatedly disputed accounts provided by Tesla founder Martin Eberhard about Tesla's early history, and reached a settlement to be able to call himself a co-founder of Tesla despite not being one of the two founders.

In 2018, the NHTSA sent Musk a cease-and-desist letter over "misleading statements" about the safety of Tesla's Model 3 sedan.

In 2020, the Environmental Protection Agency publicly denied a claim made by Musk that the agency made a mistake when testing the Model S sedan's mileage rating.

=== New York Times test drive dispute ===
In early 2013, Tesla approached the New York Times to publish a story "Focused on future advancements in our Supercharger technology". In February 2013, the Times published an account on the newly installed Supercharger network on freeway between Boston and New York City. The author describes fundamental flaws in the Model S sedan, primarily that the range was severely lowered in the below-freezing temperatures of the American Northeast. At one point the vehicle died completely and needed to be towed to a charging station.

After the story was published, Tesla stock dipped 3%. Three days later, Musk responded with a series of tweets, calling the article "fake", and followed up with a lengthy blog post disputing several of the article's claims. He called it a "salacious story" and provided data, annotated screenshots and maps obtained from recording equipment installed in the press vehicle as evidence that Times had fabricated much of the story.

[...] Instead of plugging in the car, he drove in circles for over half a mile in a tiny, 100-space parking lot. When the Model S valiantly refused to die, he eventually plugged it in.

— Elon Musk, A Most Peculiar Test Drive – Tesla Blog

In a statement, the Times stood by the accuracy of the story, calling it "completely factual". Author John Broder quickly issued a rebuttal in which he clarified and rejected many of the accusations made by Musk.

[...] I drove around the Milford service plaza in the dark looking for the Supercharger, which is not prominently marked. I was not trying to drain the battery. (It was already on reserve power.) As soon as I found the Supercharger, I plugged the car in.

— John Broder, That Tesla Data: What It Says and What It Doesn't — The New York Times

During further investigation by the media, Musk said "the Model S battery never ran out of energy at any time, including when Broder called the flatbed truck." Auto blog Jalopnik contacted Rogers Automotive & Towing, the towing company Broder used. Their records showed that "the car's battery pack was completely drained." In his follow-up blog post, Broder said "The car's display screen said the car was shutting down, and it did. The car did not have enough power to move, or even enough to release the electrically operated parking brake."

In the days that followed, NYT public editor Margaret Sullivan published an opinion piece titled "Problems With Precision and Judgment, but Not Integrity, in Tesla Test". She concludes, "In the matter of the Tesla Model S and its now infamous test drive, there is still plenty to argue about and few conclusions that are unassailable." No legal action was pursued.

== Promotion of cryptocurrency ==
Tesla and Elon Musk have supported and promoted the cryptocurrency bitcoin. Tesla began accepting bitcoin as a form of payment for its products in March 2021, but reversed its decision in May 2021. Tesla and Musk have been criticized as being hypocritical, since Tesla markets itself as a sustainable and environmentally friendly company, while bitcoin is environmentally unfriendly due to the large amount of energy required to "mine" new bitcoin. In 2021 and 2022, an index constructed by researchers at the University of Cambridge showed that bitcoin mining consumed more electricity during the course of the year than the entire nations of Argentina (a G20 country) and the Netherlands.

After the company stopped accepting bitcoin for car payments, on May 12, 2021, Musk stated on Twitter that "Tesla will not be selling any Bitcoin", which was, at the end of 2021, worth nearly $2 billion. In July 2022, Tesla stated in regulatory filings that it sold approximately 75% of its bitcoin in the March–June 2022 quarter.

Musk has also been accused of market manipulation by using his Twitter presence to pump up the price of bitcoin and dogecoin.

== Compliance with open source license agreements ==
Prior to 2018, Tesla used modified versions of the Linux kernel and BusyBox in their vehicles without freely distributing the derivative software and its corresponding source code, which is mandatory under the licensing terms of these products, the GNU General Public License (GPL).

From 2013 to 2018, a number of complaints were made to the Software Freedom Conservancy (SFC), which privately attempted to negotiate compliance before pursuing litigation against Tesla. They announced in 2018 that Tesla achieved partial compliance and had promised to release more of their modifications in the future. As of late 2019, the SFC claims that Tesla has not yet delivered on this promise.

== Use of tax havens ==
Senator Elizabeth Warren has openly criticized Tesla for international "loopholes to help them get out of paying taxes." Tesla runs subsidiaries in the "tax havens of Delaware, Nevada, Hong Kong, the Netherlands, the Cayman Islands, Luxembourg, Malta and Switzerland", with several of the companies belonging to "high risk company types for tax avoidance."

== Conflicts of interest ==
According to The Wall Street Journal, Elon Musk has a "practice of sharing assets freely across his business empire". Several shareholders have sued Tesla, alleging that Musk's shifting of resources from Tesla to his other companies has harmed Tesla investors. Musk's xAI has hired multiple employees from Tesla, received thousands of high-demand Nvidia GPUs originally intended for Tesla, and discussed a deal where xAI would get a share of Tesla's revenue for licensing its AI models.

=== $56 billion pay package suit ===
In 2018, when Tesla's board of directors approved a pay package to Elon Musk worth $55.8 billion, a Tesla shareholder filed a lawsuit, claiming that the package had a "conflict of interest" and the package worth far exceeded the industry average. In 2024, Delaware judge Kathaleen McCormick voided the pay package, noting that Musk had "extensive ties" with the negotiators, and failed to prove the fairness of the package. Musk responded by tweeting "Never incorporate your company in the state of Delaware."

=== Nvidia AI chip purchase ===
In June 2024, CNBC revealed that Elon Musk ordered Nvidia to redirect "a sizable shipment of AI [artificial intelligence] processors that had been reserved for Tesla to his social media company X". A former Tesla supply chain analyst noted that this move willingly delayed Tesla's progress in building out its autonomous driving and robotics capabilities. Musk responded to concerns by saying "Tesla had no place to send the Nvidia chips to turn them on, so they would have just sat in a warehouse," until the south extension of the Gigafactory Texas is complete.

== See also ==
- Elon Musk's Crash Course
- List of lawsuits involving Tesla
- Swasticar
- Tesla and unions
- Tesla Takedown
- TSLAQ
