= TSLAQ =

Group of people who criticize Tesla, Inc.

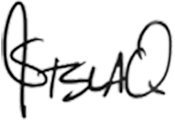
- Nickname: $TSLAQ, TESLAQ
- Named after: Tesla ticker symbol + "Q" which is NASDAQ notation for bankruptcy
- Formation: July 24, 2018; 7 years ago
- Type: Anti-Tesla, networked advocacy, fraud deterrence, pro-shorting
- Origins: Twitter
- Region served: International
- Key people: Lawrence Fossi (@montana_skeptic), Randeep Hothi (@skabooshka), Martin Tripp, @Paul91701736, @TESLAcharts
- Website: https://www.tslaq.org

TSLAQ (pronounced "Tesla Q") is a loose, international collective of largely anonymous short-sellers, skeptics, and researchers who openly criticize Tesla, Inc. and its CEO Elon Musk. The group primarily organizes on social media, often using the $TSLAQ cashtag, and on Reddit to coordinate efforts and share news, opinions, and analysis about the company and its stock. Edward Niedermeyer, in his book Ludicrous: The Unvarnished Story of Tesla Motors (2019), pinpoints the July 2018 doxxing of Twitter user Lawrence Fossi, a Seeking Alpha writer and Tesla short seller operating under the pseudonym Montana Skeptic, as the catalyst for the formation of TSLAQ.

TSLAQ highlights what it claims to be a variety of dangerous, deceptive, unlawful or fraudulent business practices by Tesla. On occasion, TSLAQ has exchanged hostilities with Tesla fans over social media. Primarily an online group, TSLAQ's activities at times include aerial and traffic photography and visiting parking lots used by Tesla to store cars not yet sold.

== Motivations ==
According to the Los Angeles Times in 2019, TSLAQ members believe Tesla is a fraudulent company and its stock will eventually crash, while also specifically claiming that Tesla was experiencing a "demand cliff" for its products and has had to regularly distort its sales numbers. Their self-reported main goal as of 2019 was to "change the mind of Tesla stock bulls and the media." Tesla was the most shorted stock in the U.S. in December 2020, with over US$34.5 billion in shorted share value at its peak. Business Insider described TSLAQ member activity in 2019 as consisting of "exchang[ing] research, news articles, and sometimes outlandish conspiracy theories about the company" and that members were "betting on the company's death and have found much success in irritating the billionaire executive."

=== Criticizing Tesla's practices ===
Tesla under Musk's leadership has been involved in a number of lawsuits and controversies, including investigations by the U.S. Securities and Exchange Commission (SEC) and the Department of Justice. News of such investigations and subsequent litigation, the alleged fraud and insider-dealing in connection with Tesla's acquisition of SolarCity in 2016 (Tesla won the SolarCity fraud case in 2022), are major organizing points for TSLAQ members. Notably, Elon Musk revealed a "solar roof" shingle in October 2016 that later was disclosed to be fake, as originally speculated by TESLAcharts. The group has also raised questions about accounting irregularities related to warranty reserves, accounts receivables, and regulatory credits.

TSLAQ has highlighted a California judge's ruling in 2019 that Tesla had violated labor laws by unfairly disciplining employees who engaged in pro-union activity. According to TSLAQ member Paul91701736, Tesla has frequently failed to achieve overly optimistic production projections. Following Musk's statement that "Tesla does not need to ever raise another funding round" in 2012, TSLAQ and others argue Tesla has had a total negative cash flow of over $8 billion and subsequently raised over $18 billion in additional debt and equity via subsidies and other means. Musk also planned to build a fully automated factory for mass production of the Tesla Model 3, describing the factory as an "unstoppable alien dreadnought ... [the] machine that builds the machine." However, footage produced by a TSLAQ member of activity at the Fremont factory revealed that cars were largely being built by hand.

== Hothi defamation lawsuit ==
In April 2019, Tesla filed a lawsuit and a request for a restraining order against TSLAQ member Randeep Hothi, also known as skabooshka. The allegations were:

1. In February 2019, Mr. Hothi was found sitting in his car in the Tesla Fremont Factory parking lot. Security ordered him to leave, at which point Tesla alleged he exited at high speed and nearly struck an employee.
2. In April 2019, Mr. Hothi spotted a Tesla car on the highway fitted with numerous camera systems and personnel in the car. He proceeded to film the vehicle, believing it to be demonstrating and filming Tesla's Autopilot capabilities. Tesla alleged that he drove erratically and dangerously.

In response to the allegations, TSLAQ members led by Lawrence Fossi ran a GoFundMe campaign that raised more than $100,000 for Hothi's defense fund. Tesla refused to produce footage from within the test car on the grounds it "risked the safety and privacy of the employees involved in the case", and dropped the lawsuit and the request for a temporary restraining order against Hothi. After reviewing the surveillance camera footage of the Tesla parking lot from the February incident, Fremont police declined to press charges.

In August 2020, Hothi sued Elon Musk for defamation over Musk's accusations in an email exchange with PlainSite's owner Aaron Greenspan that Hothi had almost killed Tesla employees. The presiding judge rejected Musk's motion to strike the lawsuit in January 2021, allowing the trial to move forward. In January 2022, Musk's appeal to strike the lawsuit under anti-SLAPP laws was denied. In April 2023, the parties settled, with Hothi receiving $10,000.

== See also ==
- Criticism of Tesla, Inc.
- Elon Musk's Crash Course
- List of lawsuits involving Tesla
- Swasticar
- Tesla Takedown
- Everyone Hates Elon
