= Ludicrous =

Ludicrous may refer to:

- Ludacris (born 1977), American rapper and actor
- I, Ludicrous, English music ensemble
- Ludicrous: The Unvarnished Story of Tesla Motors, book about Tesla, Inc.
- Ludicrous speed, after ridiculous speed and light speed, in Spaceballs
- Ludicrous mode, a drag race start mode found in cars from Tesla Motors
