= Ludicrous: The Unvarnished Story of Tesla Motors =

2019 book by Edward Niedermeyer

- Author: Ed Niedermeyer
- Language: English
- Subject: Non-fiction
- Publisher: BenBella Books
- Publication date: 2019
- Pages: 220pp
- ISBN: 978-1948836326

Ludicrous: The Unvarnished Story of Tesla Motors is Edward Niedermeyer's non-fiction book about Tesla, Inc., published in 2019. The book traces Tesla's inception along with episodes and controversies from the first fifteen years of the company under the leadership of Elon Musk. In it, Niedermeyer uses original research, anonymous insider accounts, and industry analysis to explore "Tesla's attempt to merge Silicon Valley arrogance with automotive industry standards". The Wall Street Journal noted that the book's sources have "refused to be quoted out of fear of Mr. Musk". The book devotes a significant portion of its contents to a cultural account of the ongoing "confrontation" between Tesla's fans and its skeptics.

== Reception ==
A LA Times reviewer noted, "Niedermeyer... possesses a deep understanding of how the auto industry works (and often doesn't). He's in a good position to assess the foibles of Musk as Tesla struggles to prove that it can earn sustainable profits after 16 years of surviving on cash raised from lenders and investors, with no return on invested capital to show for it."

The Wall Street Journal's review voiced some skepticism over the lack of named sources supplying criticisms of the company: "Perhaps this information is solid. But people who aren't identified can't complain about being misquoted." The review goes on to say, "The book hits its stride when the author details Mr. Musk's attempts to revolutionize the way cars are built."

== See also ==
- Criticism of Tesla, Inc.
- List of Tesla controversies
- TSLAQ, a skeptical group detailed in the book
