= List of lawsuits involving Tesla, Inc. =

This is a partial list of lawsuits involving Tesla, Inc, the American automotive and energy company, since 2008; as of August 2023, Tesla is party to over 1,750 lawsuits, and as of September 2021, it is party to 200 in China alone. A significant number of the cases notably derive from the actions of the company's CEO, Elon Musk, who is also party to many of his own lawsuits. TSLAQ, a loose collective of anonymous short-sellers and skeptics of Tesla and Elon Musk, regularly discusses and shares news of these lawsuits on Twitter and elsewhere.

== On-going ==
=== Vaughn racism class action suit ===
In 2017, Marcus Vaughn, a former Tesla assembly line worker, filed a class action lawsuit, alleging that black Tesla employees were subject to racist conduct, including "slurs, graffiti and nooses hung at their workstations." Tesla responded by claiming the lawsuit was a "hotbed of misinformation." In February 2024, a judge approved the class status of the approximately 5,977 black employees involved in the suit.

=== Litigation relating to 2018 CEO performance award ===
In April 2018, Tesla shareholder Richard Tornetta brought a lawsuit Tornetta v. Musk, et al in Delaware requesting that Musk's $55 billion pay package from Tesla be rescinded. In January 2024, Judge Kathaleen McCormick agreed. McCormick called the compensation granted by the company's board "an unfathomable sum" that was unfair to shareholders. In response to the ruling, Musk posted on X: "Never incorporate your company in the state of Delaware." In June 2024, shareholders approved reincorporating Tesla in Texas and reapproved Musk's compensation. In February 2025, Bloomberg reported that Pershing Square Capital Management CEO Bill Ackman had tweeted, "We are reincorporating our management company in Nevada for the same reason. Top law firms are recommending Nevada and Texas over Delaware." The Delaware Supreme Court overturned the decision in December 2025, restoring Musk's compensation package and awarding $1 in nominal damages.

=== Securities litigation related to Musk "funding secured" tweet ===
A class-action lawsuit from August and September 2018 regarding Musk's tweets about potentially going private (In re Tesla Inc. Securities Litigation) ended in February 2023 when a jury found Musk and Tesla not liable.

In October and November 2018, five derivative lawsuits were filed in the Delaware Court of Chancery against Musk and the members of Tesla's board of directors (as then constituted) in relation to statements and actions connected to the potential going private transaction. These lawsuits were stayed pending resolution of the class-action lawsuit. As of March 2024, two of these cases are still unresolved.

A lawsuit filed in March 2021 alleges that Musk violated his fiduciary duty to Tesla by continuing to send "erratic" tweets in violation of the SEC settlement, and that the board is failing to control Musk. The case was also stayed pending resolution of the class-action lawsuit. As of March 2024, the case is unresolved.

=== Whistleblower allegations and retaliation ===
In November 2020, former Tesla employee Steven Henkes filed a lawsuit alleging he was fired by Tesla in retaliation for raising safety concerns about "unacceptable fire risks" in the company's solar installations. Tesla solar installations caught fire at seven Walmart locations, as well as an Amazon warehouse. The SEC confirmed in September 2021 that it has an active and ongoing investigation related to the whistleblower complaint Henkes made in 2019. As of March 2024, the case is unresolved.

=== Agreement misrepresented as loan ===
A Tesla Solar customer alleged in a 2020 filing that the company engaged in "bait-and-switch financing" for reporting his solar-financing agreement as "a massive loan" to credit agencies, therefore upending the customer's credit rating. In April 2021, the case was ordered to arbitration. As of May 2023, the case was still in arbitration.

=== Texas police complaint ===
In September 2021, five police officers submitted a complaint against, in part Tesla, for a crash involving Autopilot that left them badly injured. The plaintiffs' stated aim is to "force Tesla to publicly acknowledge and immediately correct the known defects inherent in its Autopilot [capability]". As of March 2024, the next trial milestone is August 5, 2024.

=== Sexual harassment at Fremont facility cases ===
In December 2021, six women working at the Fremont factory and service center sued the company over sexual harassment. As of March 2024, the cases are unresolved.

=== Fair Employment and Housing racism suit ===
In February 2022, the California Department of Fair Employment and Housing (DFEH) sued Tesla for "discriminating against its Black workers" after it "received hundreds of complaints from Tesla workers" and "found evidence that Tesla's Fremont factory is a racially segregated workplace where Black workers are subjected to racial slurs and discriminated against in job assignments, discipline, pay and promotion creating a hostile work environment". One Black worker complained of hearing racial slurs as often as 50 to 100 times per day. In a February 2022 blog post, Tesla responded to the lawsuit and stated that they "will be asking the court to pause the case and take other steps to ensure that facts and evidence will be heard."

In August 2022, California's Office of Administrative Law declined to review a petition from Tesla claiming that DFEH failed to conduct a full investigation prior to filing the lawsuit. As of March 2024, the case is unresolved.

=== Autopilot suits ===
Litigation is ongoing in at least eight cases involving the use of Tesla Autopilot during a fatal or "otherwise serious" crash. In particular, the cases of Jeremy Banner and Jenna Monet deal with fatal incidents. As of November 2023, the Banner case is expected to go to trial in 2024. As of March 2024, the court case regarding Monet is unresolved.

On August 1, 2025, in a federal trial, a jury found Tesla to be 33% responsible for a crash in which a Tesla Model S, with Autopilot engaged, ran though a T-intersection which had a stop sign and flashing red stop light, then struck a parked vehicle, which then struck two pedestrians, killing one and seriously injuring the other. The verdict was upheld in February 2026, with Tesla ordered to pay $243 million in damages. It was the first case involving Tesla's Autopilot ever to go to federal trial.

=== Individual racism lawsuit ===
In February 2022, litigation was filed by Marc Cage who alleged racial-based harassment from his Tesla factory coworkers. As of March 2024, the case is stayed, pending arbitration.

=== Sudden unintended braking class action ===
In August 2022, a consumer class action was filed alleging that the Autopilot system in Tesla cars "contains a hazardous defect which causes the vehicle to suddenly and unintentionally brake", a phenomenon dubbed phantom braking. In November 2024, Tesla failed to persuade a U.S. District Judge to dismiss the lawsuit. The next court date is January 7, 2025.

=== Deceptive Autopilot and Full Self-Driving advertising ===
In September 2022, a proposed class action federal lawsuit was filed against Tesla for Elon Musk allegedly misleading customers "who since 2016 bought or leased Tesla vehicles with Autopilot, Enhanced Autopilot and Full Self-Driving features" with his predictions that Teslas would soon be fully autonomous cars. Over 300,000 vehicles were recalled due to being unsafe around intersections. As of March 2024, the case is unresolved.

=== California Civil Rights Department suit ===
The California Civil Rights Department filed a suit in 2022 alleging "a pattern of racial harassment and bias" at the Tesla Fremont factory. As of April 2023, the department is also conducting a probe of the factory based on a 2021 complaint and claims that Tesla has been obstructing the investigation. As of March 2024, the case is unresolved.

=== 2019 garage accident lawsuit ===
In May 2019, a Tesla owner filed a lawsuit against Tesla after her 2-year-old son performed an unintended acceleration in her Model X and pinned her against the wall of her garage. Harcourt, who was 8 months pregnant at the time, sustained multiple broken bones and went into premature labor. The lawsuit alleges that "the company knew the Model X had issues and that Tesla was negligent in designing the car without proper sensors and other safety features."

=== xAI resource and talent diversion ===
In June 2024, Tesla shareholders accused Elon Musk and the company's board of knowingly diverting talent and resources away from the company and directing it toward Musk's rival artificial intelligence company, xAI, thereby breaching their fiduciary duty to Tesla. More than a dozen Tesla employees left to work for xAI. Musk has controversially proposed that Tesla invest in xAI.

=== 2025 factory accident lawsuit ===
In September 2025, a worker at the Tesla Fremont Factory sued Tesla for $51 million after being struck and injured by an assembly-line robot.

=== California DMV lawsuit ===
In February 2026, Tesla sued the California Department of Motor Vehicles after the DMV ruled that Tesla engaged in false advertising with its use of the terms "Autopilot" and "Full Self-Driving".

== Resolved ==
=== Fisker Automotive ===
On April 14, 2008, Tesla sued Fisker Automotive, alleging that Henrik Fisker "stole design ideas and confidential information related to the design of hybrid and electric cars" and was using that information to develop the Fisker Karma. Tesla had hired Fisker Coachbuild to design the WhiteStar sedan, but rejected the design that Musk considered "substandard". On November 3, 2008, Fisker Automotive Inc. issued a press release indicating that an arbitrator had issued an interim award finding in Fisker's favor on all claims.

=== Top Gear review ===
Tesla unsuccessfully sued British television show Top Gear for its 2008 review of the Tesla Roadster (2008) in which Jeremy Clarkson could be seen driving one around the Top Gear test track, complaining about a range of only 55 mi (89 km), before showing workers pushing it into the garage, supposedly out of charge. Tesla filed a lawsuit against the BBC for libel and malicious falsehood, claiming that two cars were provided and that at any point, at least one was ready to drive. The Top Gear producers claimed that the range of 55 mi was calculated by Tesla itself and supplied to Top Gear as an estimate of the car's range when driven hard on a track. In addition, Tesla said that neither car ever dropped below 25% charge, and that the scene was staged. However, Top Gear frequently stages scenes for comedic effect, for example by showing Jeremy Clarkson having to refuel the Jaguar XJS three times during the review of it. The High Court in London rejected Tesla's libel claim. The falsehood claims were later struck out.

=== Founder dispute ===
The company founding was the subject of a lawsuit that was later dropped after an out-of-court settlement. On May 26, 2009, Eberhard filed suit against Tesla and Musk for slander, libel and breach of contract. Musk wrote a lengthy blog post that included original source documents, including emails between senior executives and other artifacts attempting to demonstrate that Eberhard was fired by Tesla's unanimous board of directors. A judge struck down Eberhard's claim that he was one of only two company founders. Tesla said in a statement that the ruling is "consistent with Tesla's belief in a team of founders, including the company's current CEO and Product Architect Elon Musk, and Chief Technology Officer JB Straubel, who were both fundamental to the creation of Tesla from inception." Eberhard withdrew the case and the parties reached a final settlement. One public provision said that the parties will consider Eberhard, Musk, Straubel, Tarpenning and Wright to be the five co-founders. Eberhard issued a statement about Musk's foundational role in the company: "As a co-founder of the company, Elon's contributions to Tesla have been extraordinary."

=== Ecotricity agreement ===
In early 2014, Tesla reportedly tried to break the exclusivity agreement their charging partner in the UK had for locations along the UK's highways and tried to "blacken Ecotricity's name with politicians and the media". Ecotricity replied by taking an injunction against them. The dispute was resolved out of court.

=== Securities litigation relating to SolarCity's financial statements and guidance ===
On March 28, 2014, a purported stockholder class action was filed in the U.S. District Court for the Northern District of California against SolarCity and two of its officers. The complaint alleges violations of federal securities laws and seeks unspecified compensatory damages and other relief on behalf of a purported class of purchasers of SolarCity's securities from March 6, 2013, to March 18, 2014. On March 8, 2018, the Court upheld the District Court ruling of dismissal and judgment in Tesla's favor. The case is concluded.

Tesla was also party to a lawsuit filed in July 2018, alleging that SolarCity improperly fired three employees who blew the whistle on fraudulent sales records at the company. On June 5, 2020, the lawsuit was dismissed with prejudice.

=== Illegal workers suit ===
The Mercury News in 2016 investigated the use of foreign construction workers to build Tesla's paint shop at Tesla Factory. A whistleblower federal lawsuit was filed, which was unsealed in the summer of 2017. The suit alleged that Tesla and other major automakers such as Mercedes-Benz, BMW and Volkswagen, illegally used foreign construction workers to build their U.S. factories. Court documents and the journalistic investigation showed that at least 140 foreign workers worked on the factory expansion, some of whom had questionable work visas, for as little as five dollars per hour. The workers came mainly from Eastern Europe on "suspect visas hired through subcontractors."

On March 20, 2019, a decision by the United States District Court in San Jose dismissed most claims. The parties entered into a confidential settlement on January 17, 2020, and as of August 2022, the court retained jurisdiction to enforce compliance of the terms.

=== Singapore tax surcharge ===
In early March 2016, a report by Stuff magazine said that test performed by VICOM, Ltd on behalf of Singapore's Land Transport Authority had found a 2014 Tesla Model S to be consuming 444 Wh/km (0.715 kW⋅h/mi), which was greater than the 236 watt-hours per kilometre (0.38 kW⋅h/mi) reported by the U.S. Environmental Protection Agency (EPA) and the 181 watt-hours per kilometre (0.291 kW⋅h/mi) reported by Tesla. As a result, a carbon surcharge of S$15,000 (US$10,900 at March 2016 exchange rate) was imposed on the Model S, making Singapore the only country in the world to impose an environmental surcharge on a fully electric car. The Land Transport Authority justified this by stating that it had to "account for CO_{2} emissions during the electricity generation process" and therefore "a grid emission factor of 0.5g/watt-hour was also applied to the electric energy consumption", however Tesla countered that when the energy used to extract, refine, and distribute gasoline was taken into account, the Model S produces approximately one-third the CO_{2} of an equivalent gasoline-powered vehicle.

Later that month, the Land Transport Authority released a statement stating that they and the VICOM Emission Test Laboratory will be working with Tesla engineers to review the test, and a Tesla statement indicated that the discussions were "positive" and that they were confident of a quick resolution.

As of February 2021, consumers can order a new Tesla to be imported into Singapore, for delivery in mid-2021, with no mention of a surcharge. As of October 2021, Teslas sold in Singapore increased ten-fold to 487 in the third quarter, compared to just 50 in the first half of 2021.

=== Workplace harassment ===
One female engineer at Tesla filed a lawsuit in 2016 describing a culture of "pervasive harassment". The lawsuit was dismissed with prejudice in 2019.

=== Corporate litigation relating to the SolarCity acquisition ===
Between September 1, 2016, and October 5, 2016, seven lawsuits were filed in the Court of Chancery of the State of Delaware challenging Tesla's acquisition of SolarCity. In October 2016, the Court consolidated the actions and appointed a lead plaintiff. The plaintiffs alleged, among other things, that the Tesla board of directors as then constituted breached their fiduciary duties in approving the acquisition and that certain individuals would be unjustly enriched by the acquisition. The complaint asserts both derivative claims and direct claims on behalf of a purported class and seeks, among other relief, $13 billion from Elon Musk.

The acquisition was approved by Tesla and SolarCity's stockholders on November 17, 2016 and the merger closed on November 21, 2016. On October 24, 2019, the transcripts of video depositions of Elon Musk and other SolarCity board members became widely available. The trial was held in July 2021. On October 22, 2021, the lawsuit was limited to a derivative lawsuit and the direct claims against Musk were dismissed. The Delaware Court of Chancery ruled in Musk's favor in April 2022, and its ruling was upheld by the Delaware Supreme Court in June 2023.

=== SEC investigations in 2016 regarding GAAP reporting ===
An SEC investigation in October 2016 about Tesla's use of non-GAAP (Generally Accepted Accounting Principles) reporting closed "without further action"; Tesla switched to GAAP-reporting in October 2016.

=== Autopilot 2 class-action lawsuit ===
On April 19, 2017, Tesla owners filed a class-action lawsuit due to Tesla exaggerating the capabilities of its Autopilot 2 to consumers. The lawsuit claimed that "buyers of the affected vehicles have become beta testers of half-baked software that renders Tesla vehicles dangerous if engaged". Tesla attacked the lawsuit as a "disingenuous attempt to secure attorney's fees posing as a legitimate legal action".

On May 19, 2018, Tesla reached an agreement to settle the class-action lawsuit. Under the agreement, class members, who paid to get the Autopilot upgrade between 2016 and 2017, will receive between US$20 and $280 in compensation. Tesla has agreed to place more than $5 million into a settlement fund, which will also cover attorney fees. The proposed settlement does not mention the safety allegations but focuses on the delay in making the promised features available to consumers. The agreement was approved in November 2018.

=== Union busting attempts ===
On April 19, 2017, Tesla factory workers filed unfair labor practice charges with the National Labor Relations Board, alleging that Tesla uses "illegal surveillance, coercion, intimidation and prevention of worker communications [...] in an effort to prevent or otherwise hinder unionization of the Fremont factory."

According to CNBC, "the United Auto Workers (UAW) union filed four separate charges with the National Labor Relations Board alleging that [Tesla] has illegally surveilled and coerced workers attempting to distribute information about the union drive." On February 10, 2017, three Tesla employees allegedly were passing out literature to initiate organizing union efforts. The literature pointed to working conditions, the company's confidentiality agreement and employee rights under the National Labor Relations Act. The UAW's charges allege that Tesla illegally told employees that they could not pass out any literature unless it was approved by the company.

The Fremont plant has been unionized in the past, both when owned by General Motors (GM), and later by the NUMMI partnership of GM and Toyota. While under UAW oversight, the plant closed once in 1982 (GM) and again in 2010 (NUMMI partnership) .

Elon Musk published a tweet in May 2018, that implied workers would lose stocks if they formed a union. Minnesota Congressman Keith Ellison chastised Musk for "threats" of unlawful retaliation. Three years later, the NLRB ordered Musk to delete that tweet, and reinstate former employee Richard Ortiz with full back pay. Additionally Tesla would have to put up a notice in all of its USA factories addressing the unlawful tweet.

Tesla appealed the NLRB rulings to the United States Court of Appeals for the Fifth Circuit, which in 2023 initially upheld the NLRB order. In a published response, Ortiz stated "I look forward to returning to work at Tesla and working with my co-workers to finish the job of forming a union". In a 2024 rehearing, the court reversed its decision, holding Musk's tweets to be constitutionally protected speech and that the NLRB must reconsider its order to reinstate Ortiz.

In September 2019, a California judge ruled that 12 actions by Musk and other Tesla executives violated labor laws in 2017 and 2018 when they sabotaged employee attempts to unionize.

=== Securities litigation relating to production of Model 3 vehicles ===
In 2017, a lawsuit alleged Tesla made materially false and misleading statements regarding its preparedness to produce Model 3 vehicles. The U.S. Department of Justice also began an investigation in 2018 into whether Tesla misled investors and misstated production figures about its Model 3 car. The lawsuit was dismissed in Tesla's favor in March 2019.

=== Reselling "lemon" cars ===
In February 2018, Tesla was accused of reselling defective "lemon" cars in the U.S.; Tesla denied the claim. On December 11, 2018, the case was ordered to arbitration. In March 2022, the case was dismissed by the court. In Norway in 2018, Tesla buyers have gone to court with the claim that they had been sold cars with defects, and Tesla bought back the car.

=== Software copyright infringement ===
In May 2018, it was reported that Tesla had for five or six years been using other people's copyrighted software unlawfully, specifically engaging in GPL violations. The Software Freedom Conservancy reportedly alerted Tesla to the issue repeatedly, but only in 2018 did Tesla begin to remedy its non-compliance with the software's license terms.

=== Martin Tripp leak and hacking ===
In June 2018, Tesla employee Martin Tripp leaked information that Tesla was scrapping or reworking up to 40% of its raw materials at the Nevada Gigafactory. Tripp was fired after allegedly confessing. On June 20, 2018, Tesla filed a civil lawsuit in Nevada against Tripp, accusing him of hacking the automaker and supplying sensitive information to unnamed third parties. Tripp then filed a lawsuit against Tesla and claimed Tesla's Security team gave police a false tip that he was planning a mass shooting at the Nevada factory. By June 27, 2018, Tesla had been granted subpoenas compelling several companies that may be storing data for the former employee, including Apple, Microsoft, Google, Facebook and Dropbox to surrender any such data. Also in late June 2018, the ex-employee reacted by attempting to crowd-fund $500,000 for his legal defense and counter-suit. The court ruled in Tesla's favor on September 17, 2020.

=== Whistleblower allegations and retaliation ===
In June 2018, former Tesla high-level safety official Carlos Ramirez sued the company for failing to treat injured workers and misclassifying worker injuries to avoid reporting them to authorities. Ramirez alleged that he was fired by Tesla in retaliation for raising concerns about these practices. In October 2018, the case was ordered to arbitration, and the case was closed in August 2021.

In August 2018, former Tesla employee Karl Hansen filed a whistleblower complaint with the SEC alleging that Tesla failed to disclose an alleged drug trafficking ring at the Nevada Gigafactory "involving the sale of significant quantities of cocaine and possibly crystal methamphetamine" for a Mexican drug cartel. Hansen also accused Tesla of spying on employees and hiding the theft of $37 million worth of copper and other raw materials. Hansen alleged that he was retaliated against and wrongfully terminated by Tesla for raising these issues internally. In 2019, Hansen filed a lawsuit related to these allegations; in 2020, the judged ordered the case to arbitration. In June 2022, the arbitrator filed an unopposed motion with the court stating Hansen "has failed to establish the claims...Accordingly his claims are denied, and he shall take nothing".

In 2019, Lynn Thompson sued Tesla for terminating his security contract after he reported the theft of US$37 million worth of copper and other raw materials to local authorities. In 2020, the case was stayed pending arbitration. In February 2024, the case was dismissed with prejudice.

=== Investigation and settlement by DOJ and SEC of Musk "funding secured" tweet ===
Avatar of Elon Musk

Elon Musk
Twitter
@elonmusk

Am considering taking Tesla private at $420. Funding secured.

7 Aug 2018

Avatar of Elon Musk

Elon Musk
Twitter
@elonmusk

Shareholders could either to sell at 420 or hold shares & go private

7 Aug 2018

In September 2018, the U.S. Department of Justice (DOJ) began investigating Tesla based on a tweet sent out by Elon Musk. In the tweet, Musk stated that he was "considering taking Tesla private", and that he had "funding secured" to complete the deal. Musk's announcement came as a surprise to shareholders, and consequently the company's stock price rose by almost 11 percent; 17 days later, Musk said the proposal was dead.

DOJ investigators requested company documents in September related to Musk's announcement, and the company complied with the requests. The Securities and Exchange Commission (SEC) launched its own investigation into Tesla and Musk as well. The volatile stock price movement resulted in multiple shareholder lawsuits.

On October 16, 2018, the U.S. District Court for the Southern District of New York entered a final judgment approving the terms of a settlement filed with the Court on September 29, 2018, in connection with the actions taken by the SEC relating to Musk's prior statement that he was considering taking Tesla private. Without admitting or denying any of the SEC's allegations, and with no restriction on Musk's ability to serve as an officer or director on the board (other than as its chair), among other things, Tesla and Musk paid civil penalties of $20 million each and agreed that an independent director will serve as chair of the board for at least three years.

=== Shareholder lawsuit regarding Musk "funding secured" tweet ===
Between August 10, 2018, and September 6, 2018, nine purported stockholder class actions were filed against Tesla and Elon Musk in connection with Elon Musk's August 7, 2018, Twitter post that he was considering taking Tesla private. All of the suits were consolidated into a class-action lawsuit in the United States District Court for the Northern District of California. The lawsuit asserted claims for violations of federal securities laws related to Mr. Musk's statement and seek unspecified compensatory damages and other relief on behalf of a purported class of purchasers of Tesla's securities. In February 2023, the jury found Musk and Tesla not liable.

=== Employee theft of Autopilot source code ===
In 2019 Tesla filed a lawsuit against a named employee alleging that the employee who had worked for Tesla for two years had copied the source code of the Tesla Autopilot before joining a competing startup. In April 2021 Tesla settled the lawsuit for an undisclosed payment from the former employee.

=== Autopilot fatality suits ===
In May 2019, a civil lawsuit was filed regarding the death of Apple engineer Walter Huang while driving using Autopilot in 2018. The case was settled in April 2024 before it went to trial. It is the first time Tesla has settled a case involving Autopilot.

=== Battery throttling lawsuits ===
In August 2019, a class action lawsuit was filed in Northern California, claiming that a 2019 over-the-air software update throttled the Model S battery life, some by as much as 40 miles. On December 7, 2020, Tesla settled the suit for $1.5 million.

In April 2021, a Norwegian judge found Tesla guilty of throttling charging speed in a similar suit, after they failed to respond to the lawsuit. The 30 customers who were part of the lawsuit were awarded 136,000 Norwegian kroner each ($16,000).

=== Child labor lawsuit ===
International Rights Advocates, Inc. filed an injunctive relief and damages class-action lawsuit against Apple, Microsoft, Dell, and Tesla in December 2019. The plaintiff was representing fourteen Congolese parents and children seeking relief and damage fees for these companies aiding and abetting the use of young children in the Democratic Republic of Congo (DRC) cobalt mining industry. The plaintiff also pursued relief on the common law basis of negligent supervision, enrichment, and intentional infliction of emotional distress. In November 2021, a federal judge dismissed the suit, ruling, among other things, that there was no causal relationship between the companies and the individuals' injuries. In March 2024, the Court of Appeals for the District of Columbia Circuit ruled that the plaintiffs had standing for the damages claims, but affirmed the dismissal because of failure to state a claim.

=== Litigation related to Directors' compensation ===
On June 17, 2020, a Detroit pension fund filed a derivative action against the Tesla board members. The lawsuit claims the board members have consistently awarded themselves unfair and excessive compensation from 2017 to 2020. In July 2023, the directors denied wrongdoing and settled the lawsuit by agreeing to return $735 million to the company, besides consenting to forgo compensation for the years 2021 through 2023.

=== Berry discrimination case ===
In July 2021, former employee Melvin Berry was awarded $1 million in his discrimination case in arbitration against Tesla. Supervisors had referred to Berry using a racial slur, and retaliated against him when he complained.

=== Full-Self Driving claim ===
In August 2021, a Tesla owner filed a complaint that Tesla "fraudulently concealed its engineering failures" in regards to its beta Full Self-Driving software and falsely represented the capabilities of the product. As of September 2022, the case is closed.

=== Diaz discrimination case ===
In October 2021 a jury verdict in the Owen Diaz vs. Tesla trial awarded the plaintiff $137 million in damages after he faced racial harassment at Tesla's Fremont facility during 2015–2016.

In April 2022, federal judge William Orrick upheld the jury finding of Tesla's liability but reduced the award to $15 million. Tesla had sought to limit the amount to $600,000.

In April 2023, a jury in the newest retrial reduced the total award to $175,000 in damages for emotional distress, and $3 million in punitive damages.

=== Solar roof hikes class-action ===
In 2021, Tesla Solar Roof customers who had signed contracts with the company sued after they were later presented with price hikes and delays. Following the court's consolidation of the individual cases, Tesla created a program offering to return the prices to their original amounts to those affected. In 2023, Tesla settled the lawsuit for $6 million.

=== Individual racism lawsuit ===
In February 2022, litigation was filed by Kaylen Barker alleging racial-based harassment from her Tesla factory coworkers. In May 2022, Barker requested dismissal of the case, which was granted.

=== "Whompy wheels" lawsuit ===
In February 2022, a lawsuit was filed against Tesla regarding a fatality involving suspension breakage (so-called "whompy wheels"). The lawsuit follows a Tesla recall in China due to breakages of front and rear suspension linkages and ball joints, noting that the same components are used in all Tesla models sold worldwide. Tesla had recently claimed in a letter to the NHTSA that "the root cause of the issue is driver abuse... uniquely severe in the China market." In March 2022, the case was dismissed.

=== Dogecoin racketeering lawsuit ===
In June 2022, Musk, Tesla, and other companies led by him were listed as defendants in a class action lawsuit claiming they participated in a pyramid scheme around the price of Dogecoin. Damages were listed at $258 billion. In an amended complaint in June 2023, the plaintiffs additionally accused Musk of insider trading, when he sold Dogecoin worth $124 million in April shortly after he temporarily replaced the Twitter logo with the Shiba Inu graphic associated with Dogecoin, which caused a 30 percent increase in the cryptocurrency. Judge Alvin Hellerstein dismissed the lawsuit with prejudice in August 2024, writing that no reasonable investor could depend on Musk's tweets to file a securities fraud claim, adding that it was "not possible to understand" the insider trading and market manipulation allegations.

=== "Right to repair" lawsuits ===
In March 2023, a class action antitrust lawsuit was filed against Tesla by Virginia M. Lambrix in San Francisco, California, alleging that the company unlawfully monopolized the market for maintenance and repair of its vehicles in violation of the Sherman Act and California antitrust law, as a result of which owners were "forced to pay supracompetitive prices and suffer exorbitant wait times" for maintenance services and repair parts. The lawsuit was later combined with four other similar suits.

While six out of eight alleged antitrust violations were dismissed, in June 2024 US District Judge Trina Thompson allowed two claims to proceed, including alleged violations of California's Cartwright Act and Unfair Competition Law (UCL), with the court finding evidence of a repairs monopoly in Tesla's designing of its vehicles to require diagnostic and software updates that only the company could provide, and evidence of a parts monopoly in Tesla's restricting original equipment manufacturers from selling "to anyone other than Tesla."

=== Privacy intrusion allegations ===
In April 2023, a Tesla owner filed a lawsuit following reports that Tesla employees shared "highly invasive videos and images recorded by customers' car cameras" with one another. In October 2023, the case was ordered to arbitration and closed.

=== Misrepresented EV range suit ===
In August 2023, three Tesla drivers filed a class action lawsuit against Tesla, claiming that the company "grossly overvalued how far the cars could travel on a single battery charge." In March 2024, the case was sent to arbitration.

=== Hazardous waste disposal lawsuit ===
In January 2024, Tesla agreed to pay $1.3 million in civil penalties and $200,000 to reimburse investigation costs for the alleged illegal disposal of hazardous waste in 25 counties in California. Tesla also agreed to train its employees on hazardous waste disposal and to have 10 percent of Tesla's facilities audited for waste disposal for the next 5 years.

=== Chinese customer lawsuits ===
Tesla has successfully sued a number of customers in China who criticized the car brand, including after crashes. Tesla has won 90% of cases they have brought against Tesla customers in China. Customers have alleged that Tesla received preferential treatment from the Chinese judicial system which is not impartial and is controlled by the Chinese Communist Party.

== See also ==
- Lawsuits and controversies section on Tesla, Inc.
- Criticism of Tesla, Inc.
