= Diaz v. Tesla, Inc. =

Lawsuit

Diaz v. Tesla, Inc. was a discrimination lawsuit filed against electric car manufacturer Tesla, Inc. The plaintiff, Owen Diaz, was an elevator operator at the Tesla Fremont Factory in California between 2015 and 2016. The lawsuit stated that Diaz faced constant harassment including racial slurs. According to the state's Department of Fair Employment and Housing, the Fremont factory was racially segregated and Black workers testified that they were subjected to racist slurs, racial drawings, and were given the most menial and physically demanding work. Working conditions at the plant were so unacceptable, the department stated, that many Black employees had been forced to quit. J. Bernard Alexander III, one of Diaz's lawyers, told jurors that the use of the “n-word” was pervasive and virtually everywhere at Fremont factory.

In 2021, a jury found Tesla guilty, and ordered Tesla to pay US$137 million in damages, of which $6.9 million were for emotional distress and $130 million were punitive damages. The verdict was one of the most significant in this class of lawsuit.

In April 2022, federal judge William Orrick upheld the jury finding of Tesla's liability but reduced the total award down to $15 million. Tesla had sought to limit the damage to $600,000 in total.

In April 2023, a jury in the newest retrial reduced the total award to just under $3.2 million; $175,000 in damages for emotional distress, and $3 million in punitive damages.

== See also ==
- List of lawsuits involving Tesla, Inc.
