= Francine McKenna =

American investigative journalist, educator, commentator, blogger

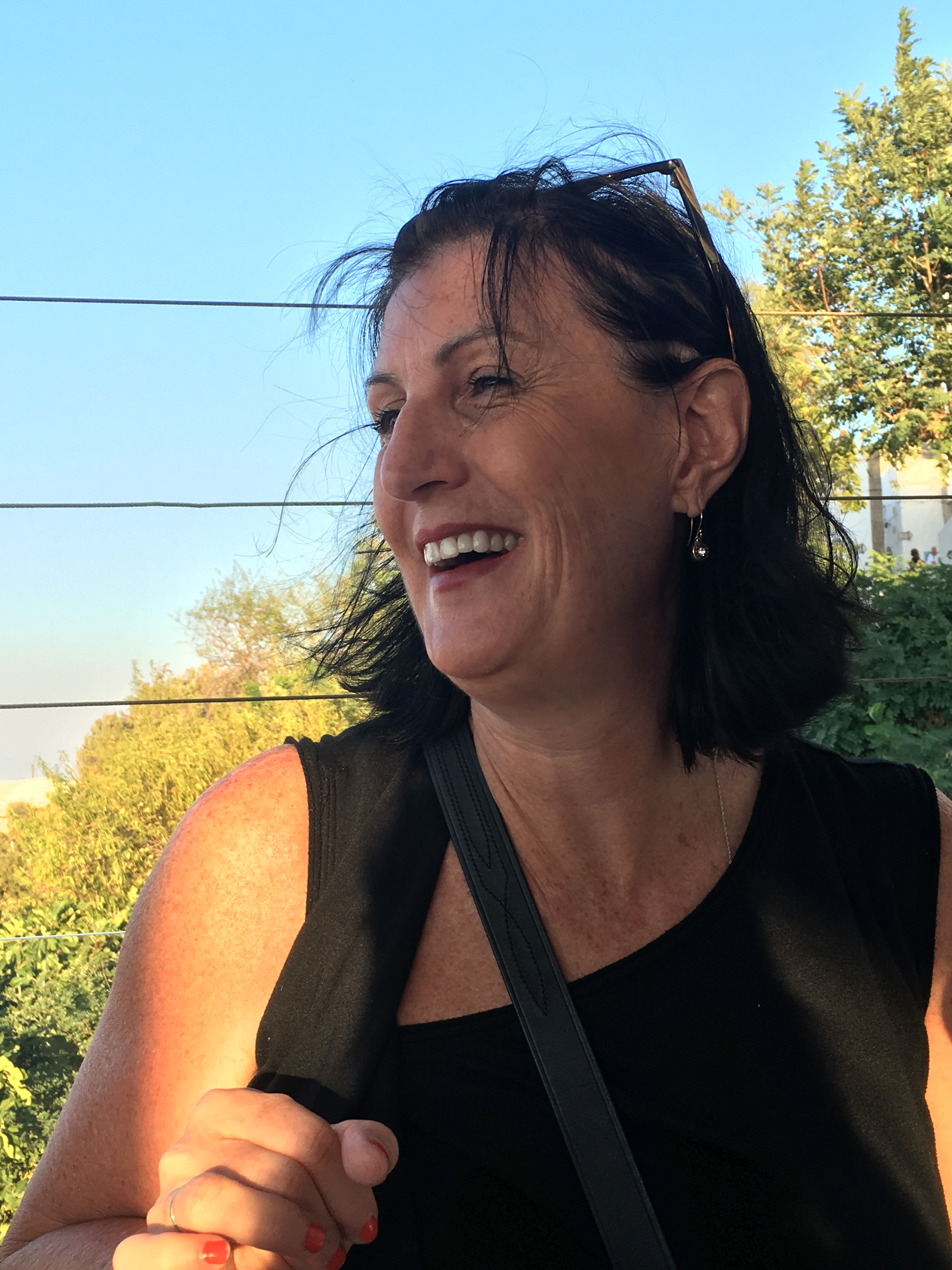
- Born: Chicago, Illinois, U.S.
- Education: Purdue University (BS); University of Chicago (MLA)
- Occupations: Journalist; author; educator
- Years active: 2006–present
- Website: www.retheauditors.com

Francine McKenna is an American investigative journalist, educator, blogger, and commentator focused on the accounting industry, specifically the Big Four global accounting firms. She has documented these firms' failures to identify problems in the accounting of international financial corporations. A registered Certified Public Accountant in Illinois, McKenna is a full-time lecturer in financial accounting at the Wharton School and writes and issues the newsletter The Dig, where she scrutinizes accounting, audit and corporate governance issues at public and pre-IPO companies. McKenna's work has been featured in The Wall Street Journal, Financial Times, Time, American Banker, Accountancy Age, Barron’s, Forbes, and Accountancy magazine (UK). Prior to joining the Wharton School, McKenna was the Financial Transparency reporter for Dow Jones/MarketWatch.

Prior to her appointment at Wharton, McKenna taught International Business in the MBA program at American University’s Kogod School of Business in Washington DC, taught graduate courses in Accounting Ethics at the Ohio State University Fisher College of Business, and taught a course in reporting on corporate fraud at Baylor University. She has twice been a finalist for the Gerald Loeb Award for Distinguished Financial Journalism. In 2006, McKenna founded her first blog RetheAuditors.com, which the author of a business ethics textbook considers "should be on every corporate accountant and CPAs watchlist." Before turning to journalism and academia, McKenna spent more than 20 years in public accounting, internal audit, and consulting.

== Education ==
McKenna earned her undergraduate degree in Management, Accounting and Economics at Purdue University and her Master's in Liberal Arts at the University of Chicago. She holds a Certificate in Executive Education from Harvard University in leading professional services firms.

== Career ==
McKenna began her career as an internal auditor at Continental Illinois National Bank and Trust in Chicago, and as an accounting manager, financial reporting manager and controller in private industry. She then moved into the professional services sector at KPMG Consulting. She directed the project to address the Y2K for JP Morgan in Latin America and was the Managing Director for BearingPoint in Latin America, responsible for the Industrial, Automotive and Transportation practice. She also worked for KPMG as a managing director in Latin America, for Jefferson Wells as a regional vice president and as a director for PWC.

McKenna's investigative journalism career began in 2006 with her blog RetheAuditors.com, which monitored and reported on public accounting firms. Her blog was a finalist for the Gerald Loeb Award for Online Commentary and Blogging in 2010, the first year of that category; as a Reuters journalist noted, McKenna was "the only full-time blogger on the list, and she’s also the only one of the nominees who is truly independent: her nomination, uniquely of the four, was not submitted on her behalf by an established print publication."

McKenna later wrote a column at Forbes.com under the heading “Accounting Watchdog”, where, in 2011, she documented PWC's failure to identify problems with the bankrupt global commodities brokerage firm MF Global. She was a columnist at American Banker, “Accountable”, from October 2011 to October 2012, where she also wrote about auditing firms' failures to thoroughly audit financial organisations.

== Career timeline ==
- 2006–present: re: TheAuditors.com editor
- 2010–2015: Forbes contributor
- 2011–2012: American Banker columnist
- 2015–2019: MarketWatch reporter
- 2017–present: American University adjunct professor
