= PlainSite =

Website dedicated to legal data transparency advocacy

- Website type: Legal
- Available in: English
- Owner: Aaron Greenspan
- Products: Reality Check
- Website: www.plainsite.org
- Commercial: Optional paid subscription
- Registration: Optional
- Launched: 2011
- Current status: Online

PlainSite is a US based website dedicated to legal data transparency advocacy developed and maintained by Aaron Greenspan. PlainSite provides both free and paid access to legal documents and information about the US legal system on a variety of subjects and caselaw. The website previously collected legal documents via the Free Law Project's RECAP archive until the archive adopted a fee-based approach.

== Reality Check ==
PlainSite on occasion publishes a report called Reality Check in which each edition focuses on a particular company and details allegations and controversies surrounding it. In the report on Credit Acceptance, the authors "questioned the health of the company and the quality of the loans backing their securities." In another edition concerning Facebook, the authors allege Facebook not only has approximately one billion fake accounts but that the company itself facilitates fake account creation in order to boost user metrics.

== Controversies ==
While PlainSite archives extensive legal documentation and analysis concerning companies, it also has had its own controversial involvements in litigious matters concerning Facebook, Tesla, and Elon Musk specifically.

In 2012, PlainSite published a list of 2,000 suspected patent trolls assembled from records available via the United States Patent and Trademark Office's patents database. Later, a man convicted in 2013 of conspiring to commit mortgage fraud unsuccessfully attempted to delist PlainSite along with other legal and government-controlled websites from Google's index for hosting legal documents pertaining to him.

=== Tesla ===
PlainSite's republishing of unsealed documents regarding Tesla's acquisition of SolarCity was noted by multiple publications, as well as a published email exchange between Elon Musk and Greenspan regarding Randeep Hothi. In March 2021, PlainSite uncovered DMV records showing that Tesla considers its Full Self-Driving technology to currently be non-autonomous. In May 2021, PlainSite released a memo in which Tesla's director of Autopilot software told the California DMV that Musk has been overstating Autopilot's capabilities, saying "Elon’s tweet does not match engineering reality". Greenspan has disclosed his ownership of put options against Tesla's stock.

In March 2021, PlainSite published FOIA documents indicating conglomerate Softbank was under "active investigation by the Securities and Exchange Commission."
