= List of predictions for autonomous Tesla vehicles by Elon Musk =

Elon Musk, CEO of Tesla, Inc., has made numerous predictions for autonomous Tesla vehicles. The predictions concern Tesla's suite of advanced driver assistance system (ADAS) functions, marketed as of December 2025 as "Full Self-Driving (Supervised)" ("FSD"), and provide estimates for when Tesla will achieve fully autonomous driving, requiring no human intervention, which SAE considers Level 5 automation. Tesla does not classify FSD according to the SAE levels of autonomy, but has acknowledged that full autonomy is "dependent on achieving reliability far in excess of human drivers as demonstrated by billions of miles of experience, as well as regulatory approval, which may take longer in some jurisdictions".

Musk has publicly stated estimated timelines and intended capabilities of the system since at least 2013. FSD and Autopilot are classified as SAE Level 2 ADAS, as of January 2024. A lawsuit filed in February 2023 by Tesla investors alleging that Musk committed securities fraud by making misleading statements about the development timeline of autonomous Tesla vehicles was dismissed without prejudice in September 2024; the judge ruled that Tesla's legal team successfully argued that Elon Musk's statements were "corporate puffery", i.e., vague corporate optimism.

Elon Musk's predictions for autonomous Tesla vehicles
Date	Prediction	Quote	Met	Ref.
Sep 2013	2016	"We should be able to do 90 percent of miles driven [autonomously] within three years."	No	
Jun 2014	2015	"I am confident that in less than a year you will be able to go from highway on ramp to highway exits without touching any controls."	No	
Oct 2014	2015	"A Tesla car next year will probably be 90-percent capable of autopilot. Like, so 90 percent of your miles can be on auto. For sure highway travel."	AP/HW1 released Oct 2015 for highways	
Oct 2014	2023	"I think we’ll be able to achieve true autonomous driving, where you could literally get in the car, go to sleep and wake up at your destination,"	No	
Oct 2015	2018	"From a technology standpoint, Tesla will have a car that can do full autonomy in about three years, maybe a bit sooner."	No	
Dec 2015	2017	"We're going to end up with complete autonomy, and I think we will have complete autonomy in approximately two years."	No	
Jan 2016	2018	"Ultimately you'll be able to summon your car anywhere … your car can get to you. I think that within two years, you'll be able to summon your car from across the country. It will meet you wherever your phone is … and it will just automatically charge itself along the entire journey."	No	
Jun 2016	2019	"I consider autonomous driving to be a basically solved problem. ... We're less than two years away from complete autonomy. Regulators however will take at least another year; they'll want to see billions of miles of data."	No	
Oct 2016	Dec 2017	"Our goal is, and I feel pretty good about this goal, that we'll be able to do a demonstration drive of full autonomy all the way from LA to New York, from home in LA to let's say dropping you off in Times Square in New York, and then having the car go park itself, by the end of next year. Without the need for a single touch, including the charger."	No	
Apr 2017	Dec 2017	"November or December of this year, we should be able to go from a parking lot in California to a parking lot in New York, no controls touched at any point during the entire journey."	No	
May 2017	2019	"I think [a driver will be able to sleep at the wheel in] about two years. So the real trick of it is not how do you make it work say 99.9 percent of the time, because, like, if a car crashes one in a thousand times, then you're probably still not going to be comfortable falling asleep. You shouldn't be, certainly."	No	
Feb 2018	Aug 2018	"I mean, timing-wise, I think we could probably do a coast-to-coast drive in three months, six months at the outside."	No	
Mar 2018	Dec 2019	"Self-driving will encompass all modes of driving by the end of next year."	No	
Nov 2018	2019	"You know, I think we'll get to full self-driving next year. As a generalized solution, I think. But that's a ... Like we're on track to do that next year. So I don't know. I don't think anyone else is on track to do it next year."	No	
Feb 2019	Dec 2019	"I think we will be feature complete — full self-driving — this year, meaning the car will be able to find you in a parking lot, pick you up and take you all the way to your destination without an intervention, this year. I would say I am of certain of that. That is not a question mark."	No	
Apr 2019	2020	"I feel very confident predicting that there will be autonomous robotaxis from Tesla next year — not in all jurisdictions because we won't have regulatory approval everywhere. ... maybe a year and three months, but next year for sure, we'll have over a million robotaxis on the road."	No	
Apr 2020	2020	"[Robotaxi] functionality still looking good for this year. Regulatory approval is the big unknown."	No	
Jul 2020	Dec 2020	"I remain confident that we will have the basic functionality for level five autonomy complete this year."	No	
Jan 2021	Dec 2021	"... I'm highly confident the car will drive itself for the reliability in excess of a human this year."	No	
Apr 2022	Dec 2022	"... in order to solve driving, we have to solve neural nets and cameras to a degree of capability that is on par with, or really exceeds humans. And I think we will achieve that this year."	No	
Aug 2022	Dec 2022	"The two technologies I am focused on, trying to ideally get done before the end of the year, are getting our Starship into orbit ... and then having Tesla cars to be able to do self-driving. ... Have self-driving in wide release at least in the U.S., and ... potentially in Europe, depending on regulatory approval."	FSD beta wide release Nov 2022 (Note: "Wide release" in November 2022 means the time in which the beta version of FSD became available to all Tesla owners in North America who had purchased the FSD package. Prior to wide release, access to FSD Beta was limited to owners who had purchased FSD and were qualified with a high driver safety score, as calculated by Tesla.)	
May 2023	Dec 2023	"I mean, it does look like [full autonomy is] gonna happen this year."	No	
Jul 2023	Dec 2023	"I think we’ll achieve full self-driving, maybe what you would call four or five, I think later this year."	No	
Jul 2023	Dec 2023	"... I think we'll be better than human by the end of this year. I've been wrong in the past, I may be wrong this time."	No	
Jan 2024	Dec 2024	"You know, I really think lots of car companies should be asking for [full self-driving] licenses. [...] we've had some tentative conversations, but I think they don't believe it's real quite yet. I think that that will become obvious probably this year. [...] if I were CEO of another car company, I would definitely be calling Tesla and asking to license Tesla full self-driving technology." (Note: Musk is interpreted as omitting "to car company CEOs" when he uses 'obvious'. His prediction concerns the representative beliefs of car company CEOs (versus their actual psychological states) about Tesla Autopilot's effectiveness changing collectively.)	No	
Oct 2024	Dec 2025	"We do expect actually to start fully autonomous, unsupervised FSD in Texas and California next year. ... and then we expect to be in production with the CyberCab which is really highly optimized for autonomous transport in probably, well, I tend to be a little optimistic with time frames ... but in 2026."	No	
Oct 2024	Dec 2026 (Cybercab)	"We do expect actually to start fully autonomous, unsupervised FSD in Texas and California next year. ... and then we expect to be in production with the CyberCab which is really highly optimized for autonomous transport in probably, well, I tend to be a little optimistic with time frames ... but in 2026."	CyberCab in limited production, but with partial vehicle automation	
Jan 2025	Jun 2025	"We're going to be launching unsupervised Full Self-Driving as a paid service in Austin in June."	Launched June 22, 2025 with safety monitor (Note: The safety monitor rides in the front passenger seat and has access to a button that performs an emergency stop. At launch, the service was offered to a limited number of invited passengers, with time and domain restrictions.)	
Apr 2025	Dec 2025	"The acid test is, can you go to sleep in your car and wake up in your destination and I'm confident that will be available in many cities in the US by the end of this year."	No	
Apr 2025	Dec 2026	"I predict that there will be millions of Teslas operating fully autonomously in the second half of next year."	TBD	
Jun 2025	Jun 28, 2025	"Tentatively, [Robotaxi will launch] June 22. We are being super paranoid about safety, so the date could shift. First Tesla that drives itself from factory end of line all the way to a customer house is June 28."	Yes (Note: The Model Y drove approximately 15 mi (24 km) from the factory to the owner's apartment complex using Robotaxi software, without a human onboard and no remote assistance, according to Musk. Upon delivery, the software was rolled back to Full Self-Driving (Supervised).)	
Jul 2025	Dec 2025	"I think we'll probably have autonomous ride hailing in probably half the population of the U.S. by the end of the year. That's at least our goal subject to regulatory approvals."	No	
Jul 2025	Dec 2025	"I think [FSD] will be available for unsupervised personal use by the end of this year in certain geographies."	No	
Jul 2025	Dec 2026	"But I guess next year is — I'd say confidently next year. I'm not sure when next year, but confidently next year, people would be able to add or subtract their car to the Tesla, Inc. fleet."	TBD	
Sep 2025	Dec 2025	“[Robotaxi] Should be no safety driver by end of year.”	No	
Jan 2026	Apr 2026	"... the CyberCab, which is a specific model that we're making, does not have a steering wheel or pedals. ... We expect to start production in April."	Yes, at a reduced, "very slow" rate	
Jan 2026	Dec 2026	"We expect to have fully autonomous vehicles in probably somewhere between a quarter and half of the United States by the end of the year, pending regulatory approval. ... we expect to be in dozens of major cities by the end of the year."	TBD	

== See also ==
- Criticism of Tesla, Inc.
- Tesla Autopilot regulatory and legal actions
- List of Tesla Autopilot crashes
