= Edward Niedermeyer =

American author

- Education: University of Oregon
- Occupation: Author

Edward Niedermeyer is an American author, analyst, and critic who focuses on the automotive industry and mobility innovation. He attended the University of Oregon. His writing has been published in The New York Times, The Truth About Cars, and The Wall Street Journal, and in 2019, his book Ludicrous: The Unvarnished Story of Tesla Motors was released. He has reported on Tesla for more than a decade. He cohosts The Autonocast, a podcast about autonomous vehicles technology and its effects.

== Career ==
Niedermeyer began covering the automotive industry in 2008 as a contributor to The Truth About Cars and later became its Editor-in-Chief, where he often covered General Motors and Chrysler. After leaving Cars, he joined The Drive as a Senior Editor and continued to write bylines as a freelancer. In 2018, he joined Automotive News. In 2019, Niedermeyer published his book about Tesla, Inc. with BenBella Books, advancing a skeptical perspective on the electric car company's history.

In response to a story broken by Niedermeyer about the company, Tesla published a 2016 blog post stating the story was fabricated and suggesting that he had shorted Tesla's stock, which led to Niedermeyer experiencing online harassment. Writer Nathan Robinson stated that there is "probably no greater expert on the career of Elon Musk and the development of Tesla [than Niedermeyer]." In particular, his insights regarding Tesla Autopilot have been cited repeatedly.

As of August 2025, Niedermeyer has a forthcoming book, The Autopilot Effect, about the "Tesla-Waymo competition" for commercial robotaxi services. He is featured in the 2026 documentary film Musk.
