= Elon Musk's Crash Course =

2022 documentary film

- Directed by: Emma Schwartz
- Starring: Elon Musk
- Country of origin: United States
- Original language: English

Production
- Producer: Emma Schwartz

Original release
- Network: FX
- Release: May 20, 2022

Elon Musk's Crash Course is a 2022 New York Times–FX documentary film directed and produced by Emma Schwartz with reporting by Cade Metz and Neal Boudette. The documentary explores the promises made by Tesla's CEO Elon Musk in regards to self-driving cars and contrasts that with the fatal accidents that have occurred using the technology.

The documentary was released on May 20, 2022, as an edition of The New York Times Presents on FX and FX on Hulu.

== Synopsis ==
Elon Musk's Crash Course explores the claims made by Musk about self-driving cars and their actual capabilities. The film includes multiple interviews, including former Tesla engineers who worked on the self-driving software which controls the cars. The film compares the concerns raised about the technology to the public statements made by Musk.

The film focuses on the 2016 death of Joshua Brown, a former U.S. Navy SEAL who is the first U.S. fatality while using Tesla's Autopilot. Brown was considered an adamant fan of Tesla, having posted over two dozen videos about his Tesla and its Autopilot features.

The documentary also explores Tesla's safety features as it developed the self-driving technology, starting with the National Highway Traffic Safety Administration's (NHTSA) investigation into the 38 accidents that occurred in 2016. The film also focuses on the death of Walter Huang in March 2018 when his Tesla hit a concrete wall at 70 mph, and Jeremy Banner, who was killed in March 2019 when his Tesla drove under a tractor-trailer. Robert Sumwalt, former chair of the National Transportation Safety Board, makes the claim that Tesla has continued to ignore safety reform following these fatal accidents.

== Persons featured ==
- Elon Musk
- Robert Sumwalt, former chair of the National Transportation Safety Board
- Bryan Thomas, former communications director of the National Highway Traffic Safety Administration
- Joshua Brown, considered the first known fatality while using Tesla's Autopilot

== Reception ==
Russ Mitchell of the Los Angeles Times wrote that the film is "solidly reported and dead-accurate". The Guardian writes that the film does not break new ground, but rather comes across as "cogent synthesis and assemblage of ample archival material". Salon concludes that despite Musk's media presence and the high-profile accidents involving Autopilot, Teslas still retain their status as sought after automobiles.

== See also ==
- List of Tesla Autopilot crashes
