= Anti–Elon Musk bumper stickers =

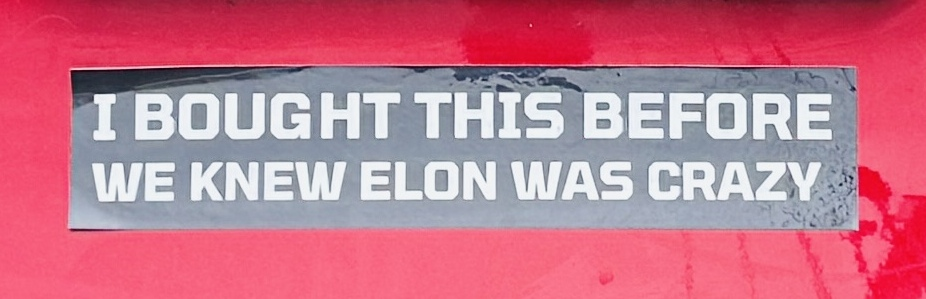
An example of one bumper sticker on a car in February 2025

Bumper stickers, often saying "I bought this before we knew Elon was crazy", have been placed on Tesla cars by owners who either disapprove of Elon Musk, the CEO of Tesla, or want to discourage their cars from being vandalized. The stickers started being used in response to Musk's increasing involvement in partisan politics beginning in the early 2020s, including his acquisition of Twitter, him being the largest donor in Donald Trump's 2024 presidential campaign, being the head of the controversial Department of Government Efficiency (DOGE) and his support for far-right causes. Amidst the vandalism of Tesla vehicles and property in early 2025, which included the use of bullets, Molotov cocktails, spray paint and keying, some Tesla owners used the stickers to distance themself politically from Elon Musk. Some users of the stickers continue to agree with Musk, but use them as an attempt to protect their cars from being vandalized.

== Background ==
Elon Musk, CEO of Tesla, Inc., became increasingly involved in partisan politics in the early 2020s, supporting the Republican Party in the United States, and in some cases, far-right causes. He acquired Twitter in 2022, was the largest donor in Donald Trump's 2024 presidential campaign and was the head of the Department of Government Efficiency (DOGE). The department, which was created to reduce excess spending by the federal government, caused mass layoffs of federal workers. In response to Musk's political activities, there have been protests against him, including the vandalism of Tesla vehicles and the Tesla Takedown protests.

Before Musk's involvement in the second Trump administration, the sale of Tesla vehicles was higher amongst Democrats than Republicans, and Tesla vehicles were used by their owners to project "innovation, environmental consciousness, or social progressivism". In response to Musk's political activities, especially his involvement in the second Trump administration, the sale of Tesla vehicles to Democrats declined and the sale to Republicans increased, but the increase in sales did not offset the decrease in sales. As a result, a Yale University study estimated that Musk's political actions had cost the company 1–1.26 million car sales from Musk's acquisition of Twitter in October 2022 to April 2025.

== Bumper stickers ==
Anti-Musk bumper stickers, including ones that read "I bought this before we knew Elon was crazy" in capital letters, are used by some Tesla owners who disapprove of Musk's political actions and want to disassociate from him, but are unable or unwilling to sell their vehicles. Some owners who wanted to sell them were unable to because the price of Tesla vehicles had dropped below the minimum price they wanted to receive. Some owners liked their cars too much to sell them, stating they wanted to disassociate from Musk, but not the cars.

Amidst the vandalism of Tesla vehicles and property in early 2025, which included the use of bullets, Molotov cocktails, spray paint and keying, some Tesla owners used the stickers to discourage people from vandalizing their cars. According to Matthew Hiller, a seller of the stickers, some users of the stickers may not disapprove of Musk, but use them as an attempt to protect their cars from being vandalized. The Conversation has written that the stickers may not have dissuaded people from vandalizing cars, but instead were used to signal a form of identity, which social groups the owners belong to, and to function as "equal parts apology, protest and cultural timestamp".

In March 2025, Matthew Hiller, an employee of the Waikīkī Aquarium in Hawaii, was earning over $100,000 per month selling anti-Musk stickers. He originally sold stickers relating to fish, but started selling anti-Musk stickers in February 2023 after Musk's acquisition of Twitter. Hiller chose the phrasing "I Bought This Before We Knew Elon Was Crazy" with the "we knew" instead of "I Bought This Before Elon Went Crazy" to imply that the users of the stickers did not initially realize that Musk was "crazy" but changed their minds. Sales of the stickers have spiked during and after each of Musk's controversial moments, such as his alleged Nazi salute. He sells other stickers such as "Elon Sucks". In November 2024, before Donald Trump was inaugurated, the business magazine Fast Company reported that anti-Musk bumper stickers were Amazon best-sellers. The sale of the stickers increased following Trump's win in the November 2024 United States presidential election; Musk was the biggest donor in Trump's campaign. Other people also sell anti-Musk stickers and people also sell pro-Musk stickers such as one that reads "I bought this after I knew Elon was awesome" which appears to be a reference to Hiller's sticker design.

Writing for Jalopnik, Amber DaSilva determined 2018 to be the year that "we knew Elon was crazy". DaSilva chose this year because it was when Musk, without evidence, accused a cave diver of pedophilia during the Tham Luang cave rescue. DaSilva also mentioned Musk's tweet that year that read "Am considering taking Tesla private at $420. Funding secured." Tesla was never taken private.

In February 2025, the Norwegian branch of the vehicle manufacturer Kia released a viral Instagram post in which one of its Kia EV3 vehicles had a bumper sticker that read "I bought this after Elon went crazy". Kia later said that it had not approved the post and "The post was an entirely independent local initiative that does not reflect the position of Kia Europe or Kia Corporation".

== Related phrases ==
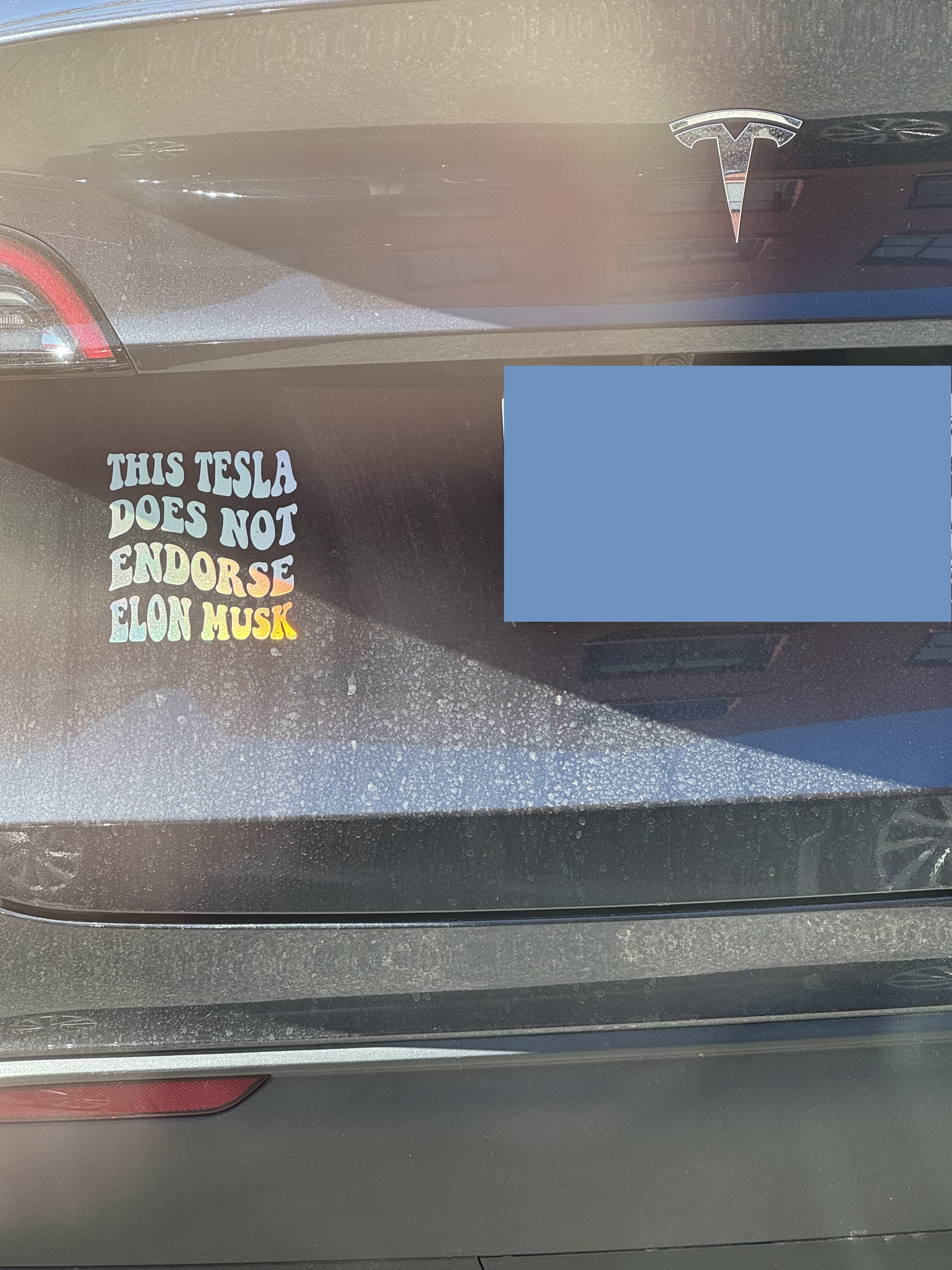
A bumper sticker on a Tesla vehicle that reads "This Tesla does not endorse Elon Musk"

Other phrases used in anti-Musk bumper stickers include "Eco-friendly, not Elon friendly", "I just wanted an electric car. Sorry guys", "Anti Elon Tesla Club" (which references the streetwear brand Anti Social Social Club) and "Elon ate my cat". In response to the anti-Musk stickers, some supporters of Musk have used stickers to express their support, such as one that reads "I bought this after I knew Elon was awesome".

Rather than using anti-Musk bumper stickers, some people have removed the Tesla branding from their vehicles and replaced them with that of other car manufacturers, such as Mazda. Other people have left their cars without any branding.

== See also ==
- Protests against Elon Musk
