= Everyone Hates Elon =

British political campaign group

- Formation: 2025
- Purpose: Protesting against Elon Musk and other billionaires
- Location: London, England
- Methods: Guerrilla marketing; Billboard hacking; Subvertising
- Website: peoplevselon.co.uk

Everyone Hates Elon is a British political campaign group. The group formed in 2025 to voice opposition to businessman and US presidential advisor Elon Musk, citing his behaviour in the Department of Government Efficiency, his statements about British politics, and promotion of disinformation. The group creates parody advertisements and viral social media campaigns to communicate their critiques of Musk and other billionaires. Their activities have included distributing posters criticising Musk and Jeff Bezos, as well as establishing a fundraising campaign in support of "causes [Musk] hates". The group also organised an interactive protest event where participants were invited to destroy a Tesla Model S to raise money for food banks.

== Background ==
Everyone Hates Elon formed in early 2025 in response to Musk's interest in British affairs, including his support for far-right activist and anti-Islam campaigner Tommy Robinson, as well as Musk's salute—interpreted by many as a Nazi salute—at the second inauguration of Donald Trump. The group began as a "ranty group chat" among a small group of friends, and is currently made up of "just a handful of people", with members choosing to remain anonymous. They told The Hollywood Reporter that they were working to "piss off Elon Musk one small action at a time", and that their campaigns targeting Tesla were intended to encourage the public to express their opposition to Musk by withdrawing their support from the company, which is the main source of Musk's wealth. In an interview with Anna Russell for The New Yorker, Everyone Hates Elon founders described their strategy of using memorable, humorous slogans to combat the catchy political messaging used by the far-right; they explained, "We can't outspend [Musk] ... but we know that we're funnier than him. He's definitely not funny." They also described their confusion as to Musk's motives for becoming involved in UK politics; Russell noted that a 2025 YouGov poll, which reported that eighty percent of British people had unfavourable opinions of Elon Musk, indicates that the group's "dislike" of the billionaire is shared by a majority of the UK public.

== Campaigns ==
=== Elon Musk ===
Everyone Hates Elon's first action was to create a fundraising campaign, titled People Versus Elon, which allows donors to pledge one penny (£0.01) every time Musk posts on X, with all funds to be donated to causes that Musk dislikes. These include organisations such as Women for Refugee Women, Hope not Hate, and Rainbow Migration, a charity supporting LGBTQI+ asylum seekers. The campaign, which is anticipated to raise £150,000 over the course of one year, was discussed in a February 2025 episode of The Guilty Feminist podcast.

Everyone Hates Elon rose to further prominence in February 2025 when they began a guerrilla poster campaign, installing posters criticising Elon Musk around London; one poster read "Elon Musk is a bellend. Signed, the UK". Several posters were designed as parody advertisements for Tesla, carrying the Tesla wordmark accompanied by the parody tagline "The Swasticar". These posters displayed slogans including "Goes from 0 to 1939 in 3 seconds", "Now with White Power Steering", (Note: A combination of the phrases "white power" and "power steering".) and "Autopilot for your car. Autocrat for your country." The posters covered existing advertisements at bus shelters in Clerkenwell and Bethnal Green. The group also produced and distributed posters targeting Musk-owned social networking service X (formerly Twitter); the posters showed an image of Musk doing a Nazi-like salute. One design carried the slogan "X marks the rot" (Note: A play on the phrase X marks the spot.) and another read "Delete your account. If the bar lets Nazis in, it's a Nazi bar." (Note: A reference to the paradox of tolerance.) In an advertisement mimicking a public health information poster using the NHS logo, Everyone Hates Elon called on the public to recognise parasites, and listed as examples ticks, worms, and billionaires.

Alongside the street furniture poster campaign, Everyone Hates Elon installed banners on London Underground trains. One of these posters carried the phrase "Hate doesn't sell. Just ask Elon Musk", alongside an image of image of Musk's salute and a graphic of Tesla's declining share price. Transport for London later confirmed that the group's posters "were not authorised" to be put up on the network, and that unauthorised posters would be "expeditiously removed".

Everyone Hates Elon also created and distributed stickers saying "Don't Buy a Swasticar", and shared the sticker templates with their followers on Instagram. The group also turned the image of Musk's Nazi salute into a life-sized cutout, and installed it in a North London Tesla showroom. They created a range of Car Freshners with the slogan "Musk B-Gone" and tagline "covers the stench of fascism".

=== Jeff Bezos and Amazon ===
On 14 April 2025, singer Katy Perry was part of a space flight run by Blue Origin, a space technology company founded by billionaire Jeff Bezos. Bezos also founded Amazon, and both his own tax avoidance and that of Amazon have been the subject of criticism for several years. Following the space flight, Everyone Hates Elon produced posters targeting Bezos and Perry. One, which was installed near Amazon's UK headquarters in Shoreditch, read "If you can afford to send Katy Perry to space, you can afford to pay more taxes." The group also installed posters featuring Perry outside a branch of Amazon Fresh in Angel, London; these posters carried the Amazon logo alongside the caption "Our tax avoidance is out of this world, just ask Katy Perry."

In June 2025, Everyone Hates Elon collaborated with Greenpeace to protest against the wedding of Jeff Bezos and Lauren Sánchez. The wedding, held in Venice, Italy, had already attracted opposition from residents of the city, and protests were held in the weeks leading up to the event by a local group called "No Space for Bezos". On 23 June, activists from Everyone Hates Elon and Greenpeace unfurled a large banner, measuring 20 by 20 m (66 by 66 ft), in Piazza San Marco; the banner featured an image of Bezos laughing, along with the slogan "If you can rent Venice for your wedding you can pay more tax." A statement from the two groups explained that although Bezos is one of the wealthiest people in the world, he "is reported to pay a 1.1% true tax rate", and that the aim of the protest was to highlight the comparatively low tax contributions of billionaires, who nonetheless "exacerbat[e] the climate crisis with environmentally unsustainable lifestyles". The banner was soon removed by local police. In response to the protests, the Mayor of Venice, Luigi Brugnaro, said he was "ashamed of the protesters" and defended the wedding, highlighting the financial gain that the event offered to the city; local activists argued that Venice needs "public services and housing, not VIPs and over-tourism." Simone Venturini, the city's councillor for tourism, claimed that the protests were motivated by "social envy" and "a desire for media attention". Eventually, the location of the wedding's main reception was moved from its planned venue, Scuola Grande della Misericordia, to the Venetian Arsenal further from the centre of the city; the move was prompted by protestors "threatening to flood the nearby canals with inflatable crocodiles to prevent [the] guests arriving".

=== Donald Trump and Jeffrey Epstein ===
In July 2025, it was announced that Donald Trump would make two visits to the United Kingdom in the coming months; he visited Scotland later that month, and a formal state visit with King Charles took place at Windsor Castle in September. Following the announcement of these visits, and against a backdrop of recent developments concerning Trump's relationship with convicted sex offender Jeffrey Epstein, Everyone Hates Elon installed a poster featuring a large photograph of Trump with Epstein (Note: The photograph was taken at Trump's Mar-a-Lago resort in 1997.) on a bus stop in Nine Elms, close to the US Embassy in London. Later, the group placed a placard with the phrase "Twinned with Epstein Island" beneath the entrance sign at Trump International Golf Links in Aberdeenshire.

During Trump's visit to Scotland, while he and UK Prime Minister Keir Starmer were meeting at Trump's Turnberry golf resort, Everyone Hates Elon drove a mobile billboard around Aberdeen; the billboard showed the photograph of Trump and Epstein, along with the phrase "Welcome to Scotland, Donald". The group stated that they had "tried to get close to Trump's golf course" with the van but had been stopped by police.

In September 2025, prior to Trump's state visit to the UK, Everyone Hates Elon again displayed the photograph of Trump and Epstein on a bus stop in Nine Elms, this time superimposed with a 2002 quote in which Trump praised Epstein and commented on their shared preference for "women ... on the younger side". (Note: In the original quotation, which was reproduced on the Everyone Hates Elon poster, Trump said "Terrific guy, he's a lot of fun. It is even said that he likes beautiful women as much as I do, and many of them are on the younger side".) On the same bus stop, the group later installed a poster that simply read "Donald Trump is a rapist". They installed another plaque at Trump's Aberdeenshire golf course, this time a spoof memorial dedicated to Epstein, (Note: The plaque read "In loving memory of Jeffrey Epstein – a terrific guy. See you very, very soon. From Donald".) and distributed merchandise featuring the photograph of Trump and Epstein among the products in the gift shop at Windsor Castle.

The day before Trump arrived in the UK for the state visit, Everyone Hates Elon unfurled a 400-square-metre (4,300 sq ft) print of the photograph of Trump and Epstein on the lawn of Windsor Castle. In a post on Instagram documenting the unveiling of the large banner, the group said that the production of the print was "crowdfunded" by "the British public", referring to a fundraiser which attracted over £32,000 in donations to Everyone Hates Elon; a spokesperson for the group said their goal was "to make sure Epstein haunts [Trump] everywhere he goes". Later that week, on the day of Trump's arrival at Windsor Castle, the group again used a large mobile billboard van to display the photograph of Trump and Epstein. The van was stopped by police as it was driving around Windsor; Everyone Hates Elon said in an Instagram post that the police had "confiscated" the van and "detained two journalists covering it". Thames Valley Police later said that the van had been stopped as part of a "security check" related to the state visit, and that "[n]o arrests were made and no vehicles were seized."

=== JD Vance ===
In August 2025, US Vice President JD Vance visited the UK with his family. The trip included several official engagements, such as a visit with Foreign Secretary David Lammy at Chevening in Kent. Following this visit, the family travelled to the Cotswolds, where they stayed at Dean Manor, a grade II listed manor house in Dean, Oxfordshire. During the Vances' stay, which was met with protest from local residents, Everyone Hates Elon displayed "a now-infamous meme of the vice president with a digitally enlarged bald head" on another mobile billboard; this was then driven around Charlbury, close to where the family were staying. The group also installed the same image on a large billboard in Cheltenham. In an Instagram post, Everyone Hates Elon stated that the campaign was intended to show Vance that he was "NOT welcome in the U.K.", further explaining that they "couldn't allow him to dine at expensive restaurants, while people in Palestine starve to death ... [they] couldn't stand by as he freely hangs out with his far right friends, while taking freedoms away [from] his people". The group also launched a crowdfunding campaign, raising funds to help them "ruin JD Vance's trip".

== London vs Musk ==
On 10 April 2025, Everyone Hates Elon held a one-off participatory protest art event, titled 'London vs Musk', in South London. During the event, members of the public destroyed a Tesla Model S, which had been donated anonymously for the purpose. The car was non-functioning and would otherwise have been scrapped; its battery had already been recycled.

Everyone Hates Elon described the event as a "public art piece" allowing participants to express their frustration with the behaviour of Musk and other billionaires and show their opposition to the growth of the far right. The event was described by The New Yorker as an "outdoor 'rage room'"; around 100 participants were allowed access to the car for 30 seconds each, and used baseball bats and sledgehammers to destroy the vehicle. They also spray-painted the car's bodywork with phrases criticising Musk, expressing dislike of billionaires in general, and calling for wealth taxation.

Following its destruction, the vehicle was to be crushed and auctioned, with proceeds to be donated to food bank charities. A spokesperson for Everyone Hates Elon explained that the group sees a connection between record numbers of billionaires and record numbers of food banks. They said that the art was "a symbol of resistance to billionaire influence".

== Andrew Mountbatten-Windsor and Jeffrey Epstein ==
On 22 February 2026, activists from Everyone Hates Elon hung a photograph of Andrew Mountbatten-Windsor in the Louvre, showing him in custody after being questioned, with the caption "He's Sweating Now". The caption referenced the former prince's comments in a Newsnight interview, in which he said accusations against him of sexual assault could not be believed because the person accusing him also described him as sweating, something he claimed was impossible for him. The image, taken by a Reuters photographer on 19 February 2026, shows Andrew in the back seat of a car leaving a police station on the day of his arrest. Museum staff removed the artwork a few minutes later. The former royal is facing an investigation for alleged misconduct in public office. This accusation is linked to his relationship with Jeffrey Epstein.

== See also ==
- Led By Donkeys
- Brandalism
- Culture jamming
- Artivism
- Tesla Takedown
- TSLAQ
