= Protests against Elon Musk =

Series of demonstrations since 2019

A 50501 protest sign in Columbus, Ohio, giving Elon Musk the middle finger (February 2025)

Beginning in 2019, protests against Elon Musk emerged in response to a series of controversies, with the latest wave in 2025 focusing on his role in the Department of Government Efficiency (DOGE) and the second Trump administration.

Hundreds of demonstrations took place across the United States, accompanied by additional protests in Canada, Germany, Portugal, and the United Kingdom. Although the coordinated protests were largely peaceful, several incidents of vandalism were reported, along with the discovery of incendiary devices and explosives at Tesla facilities.

Musk's involvement in far-right politics and European election campaigns further intensified the backlash on a global scale. Protesters often targeted Tesla stores and showrooms, viewing them as extensions of Musk’s influence and a symbol of his perceived political and economic power.

== Before Donald Trump's second administration ==
In 2019, Musk received widespread backlash after he called the British cave diver, Vernon Unsworth a "pedo guy" in a later deleted tweet after he didn't accept Musk's help in the Tham Luang cave rescue. Unsworth sued Musk for defamation, where Musk was found innocent.

In July 2020, Musk also received backlash for his statement on Twitter, "We will coup whoever we want! Deal with it." This statement is referring to the coup against Evo Morales Ayma, the former president of Bolivia, where Musk's company, Tesla had interests in the lithium deposits.

In June 2021, a handful of demonstrators protested outside the Tesla Fremont factory over Musk's involvement in cryptocurrency.

In February 2023, protesters gathered outside of Twitter headquarters following news of the Musk-led layoffs at the social media company.

In November 2023, Musk was criticized for his antisemitic conspiracy theories and antisemitic viewpoints that he shared on X (formerly Twitter). The statements were even condemned by then White House press secretary, Andrew Bates. Musk was also criticized for allowing the rise of antisemitism on X.

In May 2024, hundreds of protesters opposed to the planned expansion of a German Tesla plant clashed with police after attempting to storm the electric vehicle manufacturing facility.

== During Donald Trump's second administration ==
Many anti-Musk protests from early 2025 were organized under the banner of Tesla Takedown. A decentralized grassroots movement, Tesla Takedown coordinated peaceful demonstrations outside of Tesla showrooms. Many of these protests primarily took place within the United States. However, some protests were held by the organizers to protest in Europe, in particular the United Kingdom, Germany, and Portugal. Some protests were also organized in Canada.

=== United States ===
Several U.S Congress members spoke against Musk's role in the government during the "We Choose to Fight: Nobody Elected Elon" protests.

On February 3, protesters gathered outside the Office of Personnel Management and indicated that they would continue to protest for the rest of the week in opposition to DOGE and Musk. The protestors said that Musk had illegally taken control of the government's infrastructure, and raised concerns that Musk was an unelected foreign national who was potentially stealing sensitive information stored in federal computer servers. On February 5, a rally was held in front of the Treasury Department, organized by word of mouth and social media, with initially 50 participants that grew into hundreds. Participants included federal workers, retirees and others who were alarmed and angry over Musk and DOGE's actions and its trajectory, chanting "Elon Musk has to go" and signs reading "No Trump, No Musk, No Fascist USA" and "Musk owns Trump". Democratic politicians including Senator Chuck Schumer, Senator Chris Van Hollen, and Representative Maxine Waters spoke at the protest.

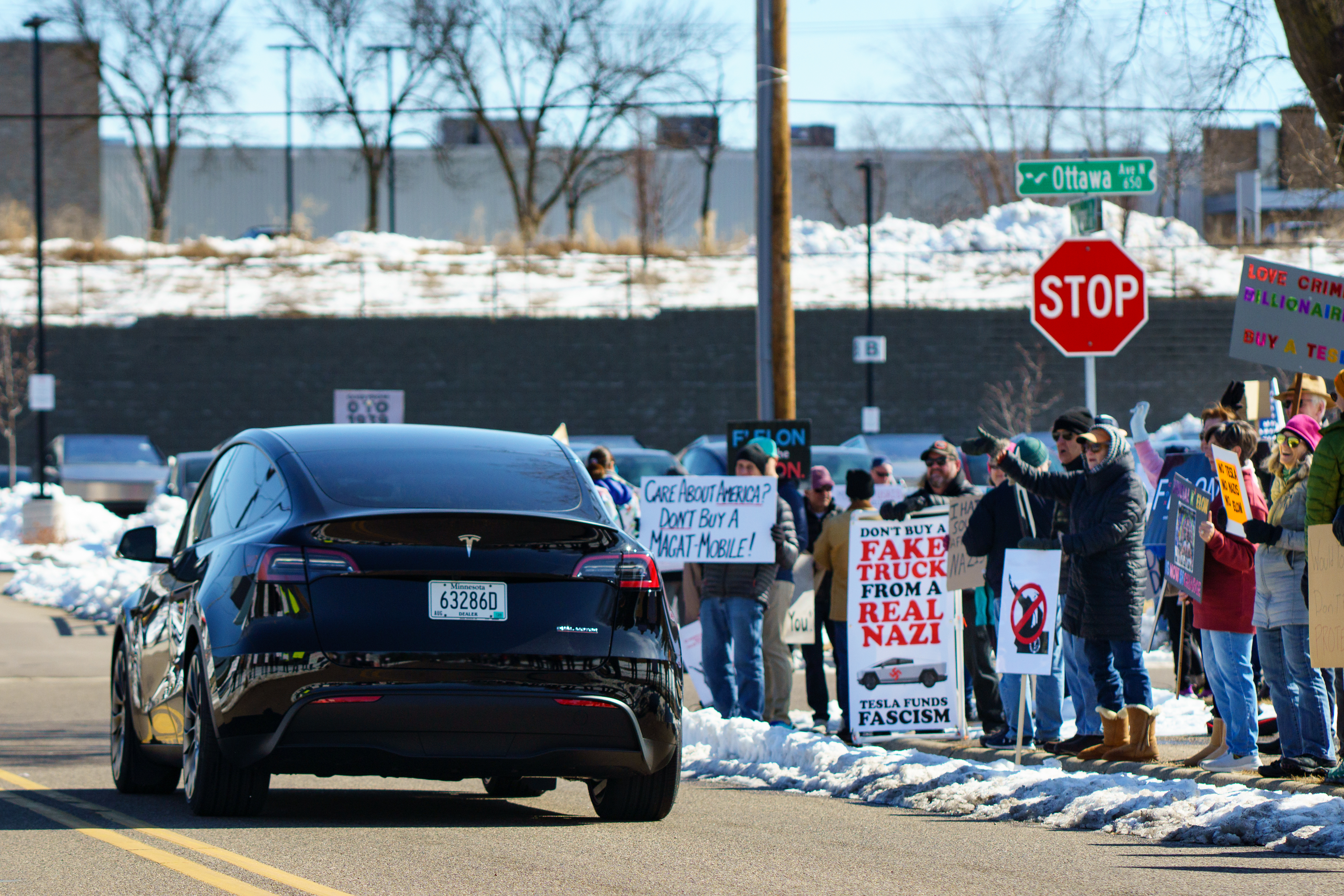
Tesla Takedown protestors at the Tesla Service facility in Minneapolis, March 2025

In mid-February 2025 it was reported that Tesla owners were selling their vehicles in protest, with 31% of polled Tesla drivers saying that Musk's actions had led to them selling or considering selling their car. On March 14, Senator Mark Kelly posted a video on Twitter stating that he would also be selling his Tesla, as it was "built and designed by an asshole".

In March 2025, a website called DogeQuest was published, which published addresses alleged to belong to American owners of Tesla vehicles and DOGE employees.

On March 11, twenty-three New York State Senators sent a letter to New York State Comptroller Thomas DiNapoli. They urged him to divest the New York State pension fund from Tesla, stating that, "Given Tesla's ongoing volatility and significant profit decline, we should seriously evaluate the risks of continued investment and its impact on the pension fund's stability."

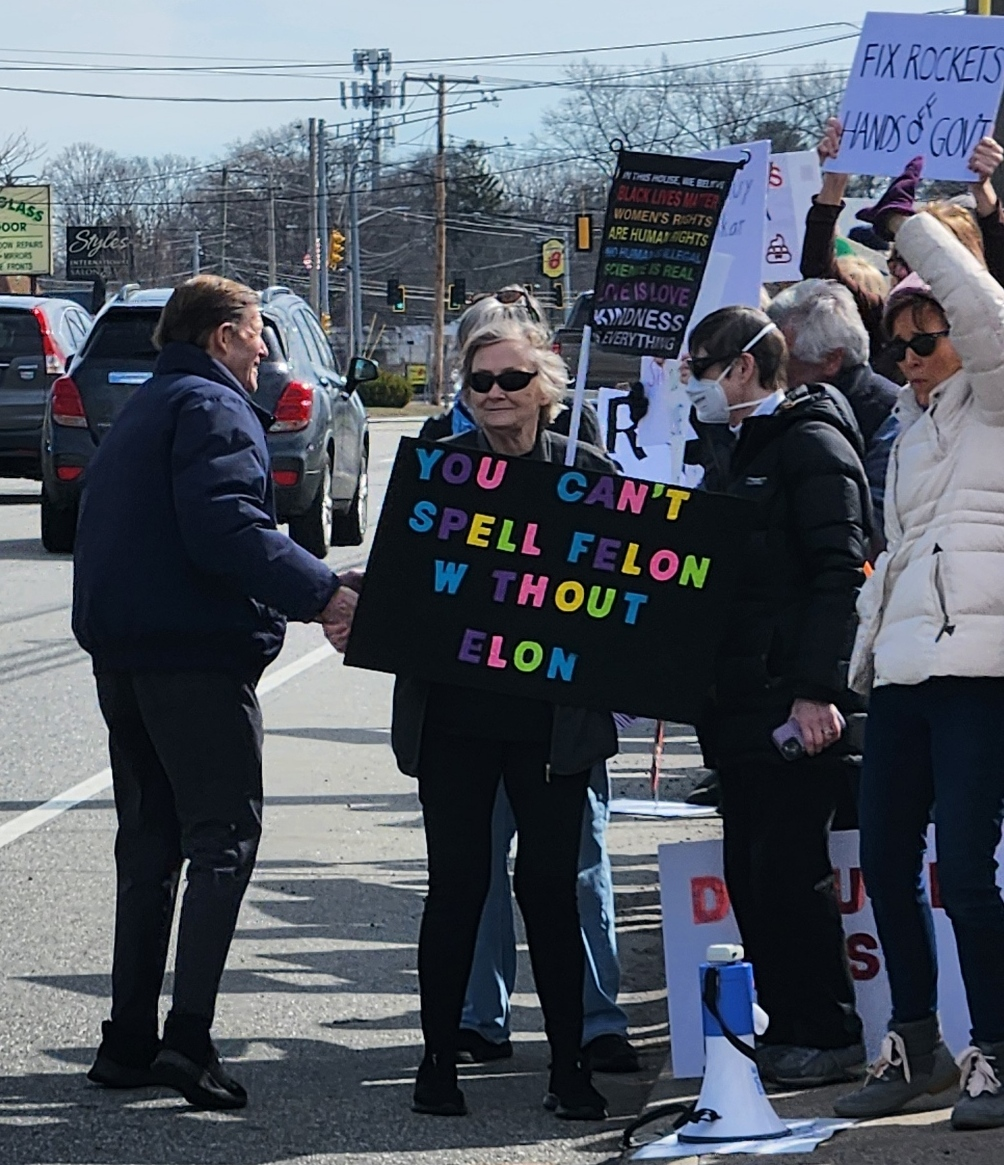
Senator Richard Blumenthal mingling with protesters at a Tesla dealership in Milford, Connecticut

On March 22, a chapter of Indivisible organized a protest outside a Tesla Dealership in Milford, Connecticut; around 300 people were seen at the protest. Senator Richard Blumenthal spoke at the protest, asking them to continue and praising Senator Chuck Schumer.

On April 5, the Hands Off protests were the largest single day nationwide protesting against both Trump and Musk. The protests were held in over 1,400 locations across the United States. The movement arose three days after the Liberation Day tariffs were announced. The protests expressed concerns over budget cuts to essential government services and programs, such as Medicare and Social Security, as well as Musk's key role and leadership in the mass layoffs of federal workers.

=== Protests outside the United States ===
==== Italy ====
Soon after he performed his controversial salute at Trump's second inauguration, the Italian communist youth organization Cambiare Rotta hung an effigy of Musk upside down in Piazzale Loreto, a square in Milan where Mussolini's body was hung in the same manner by partisans after he was executed during the final days of World War II. On social media, they posted a picture of the effigy, alongside the caption "There's always room at Piazzale Loreto, Elon."

==== United Kingdom ====
In March, the protest group, Led By Donkeys, used a harrow dragged by a Tesla car to etch the slogan "Don't buy a Tesla", along with Musk doing a gesture that was described as a "Nazi gesture" by the etcher on Black Rock Sands beach, North Wales.

On April 10, 2025, the group Everyone Hates Elon held a participatory protest art event, titled 'London vs Musk', in South London. During the event, members of the public destroyed a Tesla Model S, which had been donated anonymously for the purpose. The car was non-functioning and would otherwise have been scrapped; its battery had already been recycled.

== Vandalism ==
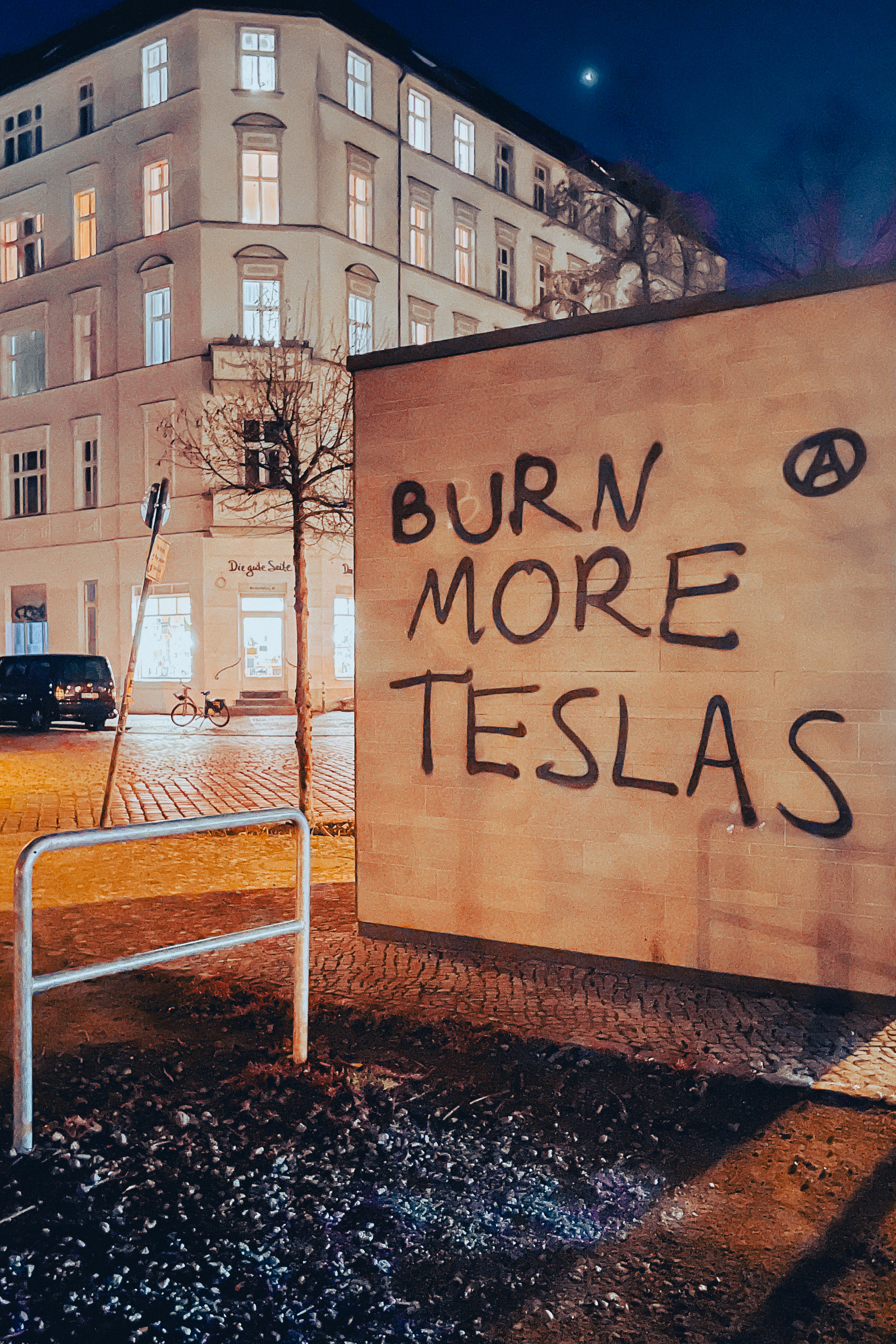
Graffiti in Berlin, Germany in late January 2025

Cases of significant vandalism of Tesla property, including the defacing of thirty-four Cybertrucks in Florida started as early as January 2025. Following initial reports regarding the controversial activities of DOGE, vandalism of Tesla properties spiked.

A Tesla store in Loveland, Colorado, was damaged multiple times in late January and February. In Salem, Oregon, on January 20, witnesses stated that Molotov cocktails were thrown at the Tesla store sparking two fires doing an estimated half million in damages. Then, on February 19, the windows were damaged by bullets at the Salem Tesla store. On March 2, twelve Teslas were set on fire at a store in Toulouse, France, destroying eight vehicles and damaging four. Seven Tesla charging stations were set on fire near Boston on March 3. On March 6, at least seven shots were fired at a Tesla store in Tigard, Oregon.

On March 24, police found "incendiary" devices inside a Tesla showroom in Austin, Texas on Monday morning. Other outlets have described the devices as explosive in nature. The APD Bomb squad responded and released a statement that "The devices, which were determined to be incendiary, were taken into police custody without incident." Police stated that "The investigation is ongoing, and law enforcement is working to identify the individual or group behind this act of violence."

=== Domestic terrorism allegations ===
On March 11, 2025, amid the growing surge of vandalism and protests against Musk, U.S president Donald Trump stated that an act of violence against property of any company, particularly on Tesla dealerships, will be considered as domestic terrorism, saying perpetrators "will go through hell".

On March 20, NPR reported that the arrest of three people who had vandalized Tesla dealerships and charging stations raised the question of whether or not such actions constituted domestic terrorism. NPR reported that these cases had included "using Molotov cocktails to set fire to Tesla cars and charging stations and possessing other 'incendiary devices' and a suppressed AR-15 rifle." NPR stated, "While no one has been injured or killed by these attacks, three professors and researchers of domestic terrorism and extremism tell NPR that they consider these cases to be acts of domestic terrorism." Bruce Hoffman, senior fellow for counterterrorism and homeland security at the Council on Foreign Relations said, "It's absolutely domestic terrorism. I know that may discomfort many people. But vandalism is a crime that if it's committed with a political motive, can certainly be defined as terrorism."

On March 21, Trump reiterated his belief that Tesla vandals were terrorists, comparing the vandalism to the January 6 United States Capitol attack and claiming that "nobody was killed" during the Capitol riot aside from Ashli Babbitt, who was fatally shot by Capitol police while attempting to breach the Speaker's Lobby. However, several Capitol police officers died by suicide in the weeks following the riot and roughly 140 officers were injured during the attack. No deaths or serious injuries had been reported in connection with the Tesla protests.

=== Musk's response ===
When questioned about the vandalism while speaking with Fox News' Sean Hannity, Musk claimed without evidence that the vandalism and violence were originating from Democrats. He stated, "It's really come as quite a shock to me, this violence from the left. I thought the Democrats were supposed to be the party of empathy, the party of caring, and yet they're burning down cars, and firing bullets into dealerships ... Tesla is a peaceful company. We've never done anything harmful, I've never done anything harmful. I've always done productive things." Musk further added how he believed there was a "mental illness thing going on", and suggested that the perpetrators were being led by a "larger force" who was funding and coordinating the violence. Law enforcement and domestic terrorism experts have found no evidence that the attacks are coordinated.

Musk also alleged that the violence was caused by individuals upset with being denied benefits that were obtained fraudulently, claiming that "... when you take away the money they're receiving fraudulently, they get very upset ... They basically want to kill me because I'm stopping their fraud and they want to hurt Tesla because we're stopping this terrible waste and corruption in the government. And well, I guess they're bad people. Bad people do bad things."

Musk also alleged that transgender people were behind the incidents, saying that, "The probability of a trans person being violent appears to be vastly higher than non-trans."

== Impact on brand ==
The stock price has been affected by several factors such as lower sales from the vehicles being a target of vandalism, but also from his controversial political activities.

== Tesla owner responses ==
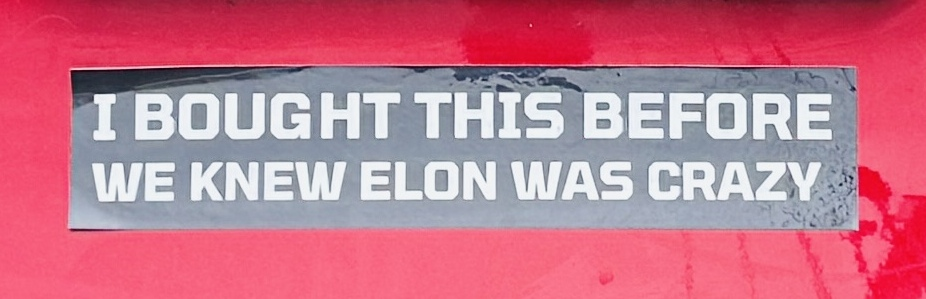
Bumper sticker on a Tesla, disavowing Elon Musk

In March 2025 it was reported that some Tesla owners were putting bumper stickers on their cars to clarify to others that despite driving a Tesla, they do not support Musk. That month, a Hawaii-based designer reported earning $100,000 a month from selling the stickers.
