= DogeQuest =

Web mapping site associated with anti-Elon Musk protests

- Website type: Map service, Anti-Tesla and Elon Musk-associated protest and doxing
- Available in: English
- Founded: March 2025; 1 year ago
- Website: https://dogeque.st
- Current status: Inactive
- Written in: Protomaps

DogeQuest (stylized as DOGEQUEST) was a website established in early 2025, publishing personal information of Tesla vehicle owners throughout the United States and doxing them, amid the Tesla Takedown protests. The site gained notoriety in March 2025 for its interactive map feature that displayed the names, addresses, email addresses, and other private information of Tesla customers, alongside locations of Tesla facilities and charging stations. This led to it being characterized as potentially inciting property damage, violence, and harassment.

== Description ==
Launched in early 2025, DogeQuest presented itself as "the ultimate hub for enthusiasts of the Department of Government Efficiency (DOGE)." The website's primary feature is an interactive map containing what it claimed to be the personal information and data of Tesla owners nationwide, as well as information about Tesla dealerships, approximate locations of Tesla Supercharger stations, and the personal data of DOGE employees.

The website featured a molotov cocktail as its cursor icon and contained language suggesting it was designed to facilitate protests against Tesla and its affiliates, amid the ongoing Tesla Takedown protests and instances of vandalism and arson of Tesla vehicles and dealerships:

“If you’re on the hunt for a Tesla to unleash your artistic flair with a spray can, just step outside — no map needed! At DOGEQUEST, we believe in empowering creative expressions of protest that you can execute from the comfort of your own home.”

— DogeQuest, in response to the question: "Is DOGEQUEST a protest platform?"

DogeQuest stated it would remove individuals' information upon verification that they had sold their Tesla vehicles. The DogeQuest website was taken down and no longer accessible on the morning of 19 March 2025 but was brought back online afterwards. A mirrored .onion version of DogeQuest called "DOGEQUEST Unleashed" was also launched on the dark web.

== Controversy ==
The website was described as a doxing website by several media outlets, with some expressing concern at its potential incitement to property damage and harassment of individuals who may no longer be affiliated with Tesla or own a vehicle. The practice of publishing private citizens' personal information without their consent potentially violated various privacy laws, though the legal status of the website was not immediately clear due to the undetermined source of the contact information. An anonymous Tesla owner included in the database expressed serious worry about potential physical threats to themselves and their family, despite being opposed to Elon Musk and having initiated the process of donating their vehicle to charity two weeks prior to the story breaking.

Shortly before the website gained media attention, US president Donald Trump had publicly promoted Tesla vehicles at a White House event. Both Trump and Musk had issued statements condemning anti-Tesla protesters, with Trump characterizing vandals as "internal terrorists" and suggesting violence against Tesla facilities constituted domestic terrorism.

Independent investigative media outlet 404 Media confirmed the information of several listed individuals as belonging to Tesla owners or supporters, and several dealership addresses were verified as correct, although other map locations reportedly did not correspond accurately to real-world positions. The complete authenticity of the presented dataset remained unverified, and the source of the alleged Tesla owner information was not disclosed by the website.

== See also ==
- Swasticar
- Tesla Takedown
- Response to the Department of Government Efficiency
- Protests against the second presidency of Donald Trump
