= Tesla Takedown =

Grassroots protest movement

- Part of: Protests against Elon Musk; 2025 United States boycott

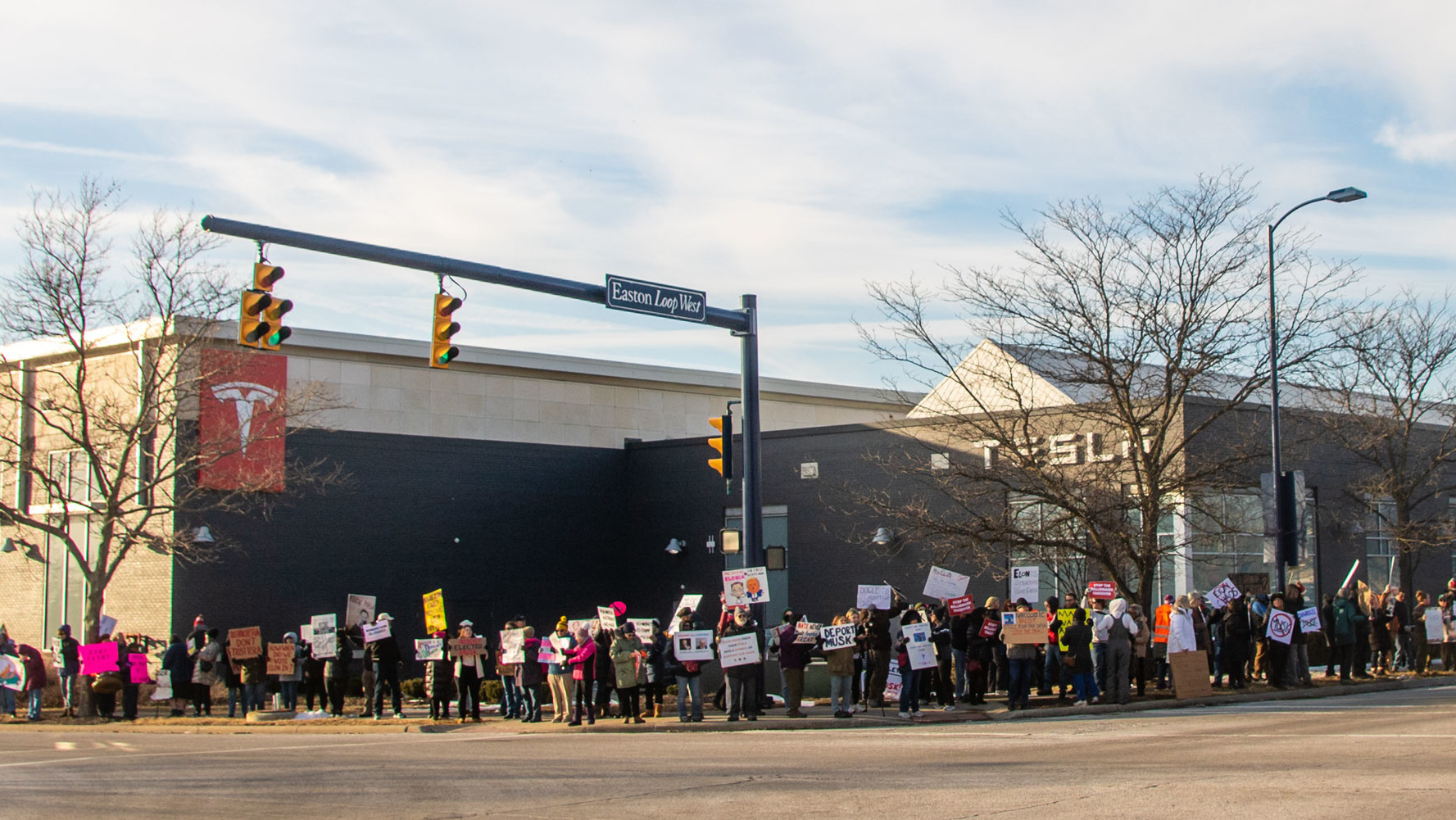
- Protest at a Tesla store in Columbus, Ohio, in February 2025
- Date: February 15, 2025 – present; (1 year, 8 months, 1 week and 6 days)
- Location: Worldwide, primarily United States and Canada
- Also known as: TeslaTakedown
- Notable participants: Alex Winter; Joan Donovan; John Cusack; Edward Niedermeyer
- Website: teslatakedown.com
- Caused by: Political activities of Elon Musk
- Goals: To economically damage Elon Musk through action against Tesla and to impact his political influence
- Methods: Demonstrations, boycotts, shareholder activism
- Status: Ongoing

Parties
Demonstrators	Elon Musk – CEO of Tesla, Inc.

Casualties
- Arrested: 9

Tesla Takedown is a grassroots protest movement that arose in early 2025 targeting Tesla, Inc. and its CEO, Elon Musk. Protesters have organized demonstrations at Tesla stores across the United States, Canada, Europe, and Australasia. The movement urges the public to divest from Tesla by selling their vehicles and shares of Tesla stock, with the goal to economically impact Musk and challenge his political influence peacefully.

== Purpose ==
Activist Valerie Costa stated the movement's intentions as "to make a strong public stand against the tech oligarchy behind the Trump administration's cruel and illegal actions, and to encourage Americans to sell their Teslas and dump the company's stock." Actor and filmmaker Alex Winter characterized Tesla Takedown as anti-Elon Musk instead of the company itself, with Musk being its "toxic figurehead".

== Background ==
The movement arose in response to Musk's involvement in the second Trump administration, which includes Musk's de facto leadership in the Department of Government Efficiency (DOGE) to carry out President Donald Trump's agenda of federal spending cuts and deregulation, and, according to the order that established it, to "modernize federal technology and software to maximize governmental efficiency and productivity". Musk played a key role in facilitating the 2025 United States federal mass layoffs and the shutdown of USAID. Musk was a senior advisor to the President during his tenure.

== Mobilization ==
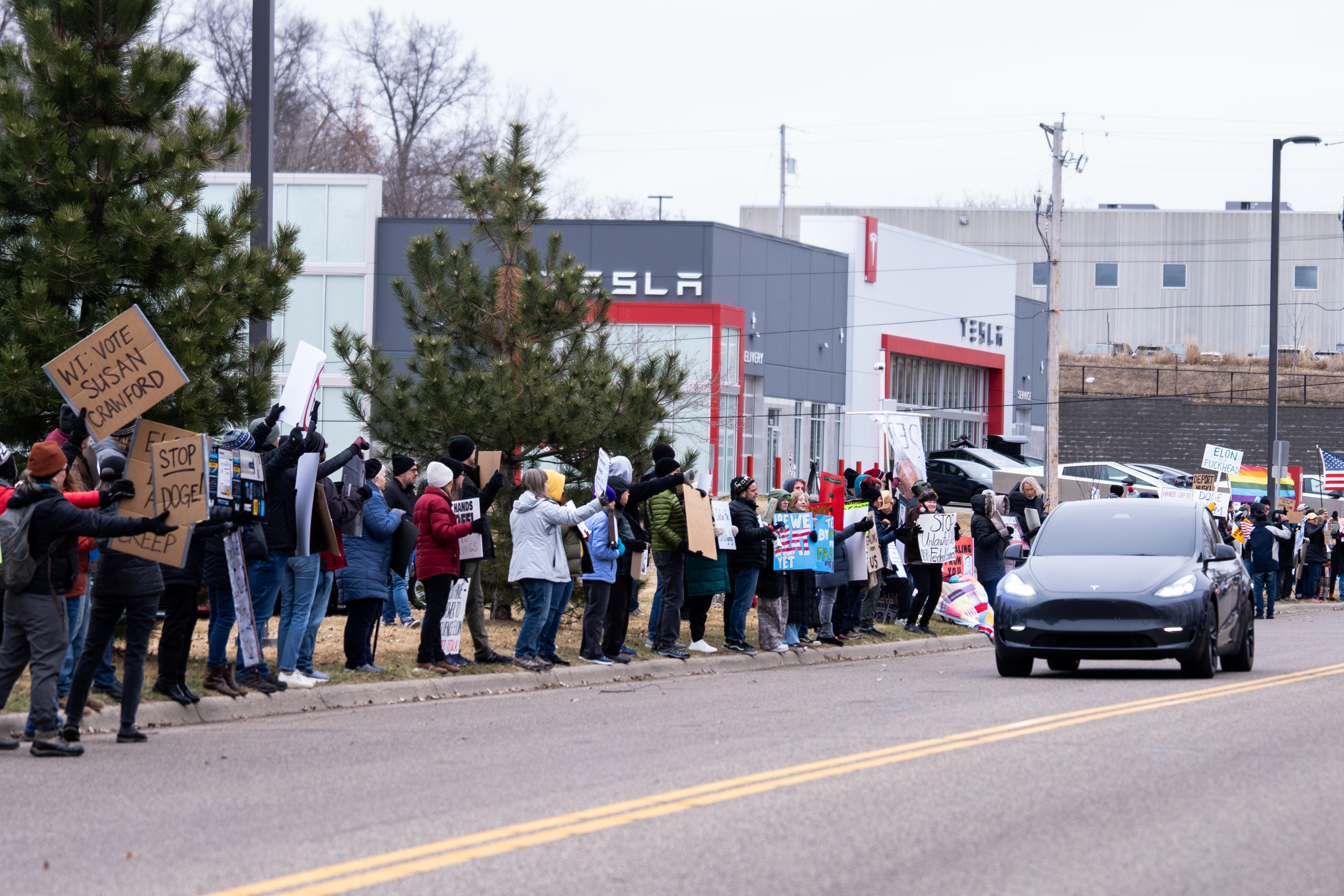
About 500 protesters outside of a Tesla in Minneapolis. Protests have discouraged some people from visiting the stores for test drives.

=== United States ===
Early protests got the attention of online activists, including Alex Winter. Winter started amplifying the protests and related discussions on Bluesky after speaking with sociologist Joan Donovan. Efforts for subsequent rounds of protests were coordinated via the social media hashtags #TeslaTakedown and #TeslaTakover.

On February 15, one of the larger protests happened outside a Tesla showroom in New York City, where protesters could be heard chanting "Elon Musk can go to Mars; we don't need your Nazi cars" referring to the Elon Musk salute controversy and Musk's support for Alternative for Germany and "Burn a Tesla: Save Democracy". Protests also took place in San Francisco, Berkeley, Minneapolis, and Kansas City among others. Musician Sheryl Crow posted to social media a video showing a flatbed truck removing a Tesla she had sold in protest.

Hundreds appeared at a San Francisco showroom on February 19. Workers included Hai Binh Nguyen, who lamented the halting of her work at the Consumer Financial Protection Bureau where she takes action against unfair business practices. Protesters also expressed concerns that government services would be privatized and sold off to billionaires.

At an early March protest in New York City, nine individuals were arrested during a demonstration at a Tesla store. Hundreds protested outside a store in Owings Mills, Maryland. A protest occurred in Superior, Colorado. Similar protests occurred in cities like Jacksonville, Florida, and in Tucson, Arizona, their numbers grew to nearly 1,800 protesters where participants carried signs with slogans such as "Democracy Unites US".

On March 16, around 100 protesters gathered at a Tesla service center in Stamford, Connecticut at a protest that was organized by the actor and comedian, Mary Beth Barone. Many protesters voiced their support for Senator Chris Murphy.

On March 20, the group held a livestream event with guests including actor John Cusack and Representative Jasmine Crockett. During the meeting, a "day of action" was announced for March 29, with protests planned at all US showrooms, and at other Tesla sites around the world.

On March 29, thousands of people attended protests at Tesla locations. Tesla Takedown said that protests had occurred in over 250 cities around the world. In particular, 100 protesters gathered at a Tesla store in Georgetown, Washington D.C, for a dance party where people danced to disco music and held anti-Musk signs. Elsewhere, a few dozen protesters gathered outside a Tesla store in Dublin, California. A few counter-protesters were seen on the other side of the street.

Protests continued through April and May, even after Musk officially left his advisory position in the Trump administration. In June 2025, organizers announced their Musk Must Fall protests, planned for cities across the country on Musk's birthday. In response to Tesla's plans to test its robotaxi service, the Tesla Takedown Austin, Texas group hosted a demonstration with The Dawn Project highlighting the safety concerns associated with the Tesla Autopilot capabilities.

=== Other countries ===
On March 22, protesters gathered at the Tesla dealership in Reykjavík, Iceland.

On March 29, protesters gathered at Tesla stores in several countries: Metro Vancouver, Canada; Cribbs Causeway, Bristol, England; Edinburgh, Scotland; London, England; Berlin, Germany; New Zealand; Australia; Norway; Finland; Denmark; Germany; Belgium; the Netherlands; and France. Counter protesters attended the Vancouver event.

== Other anti-Tesla protests ==
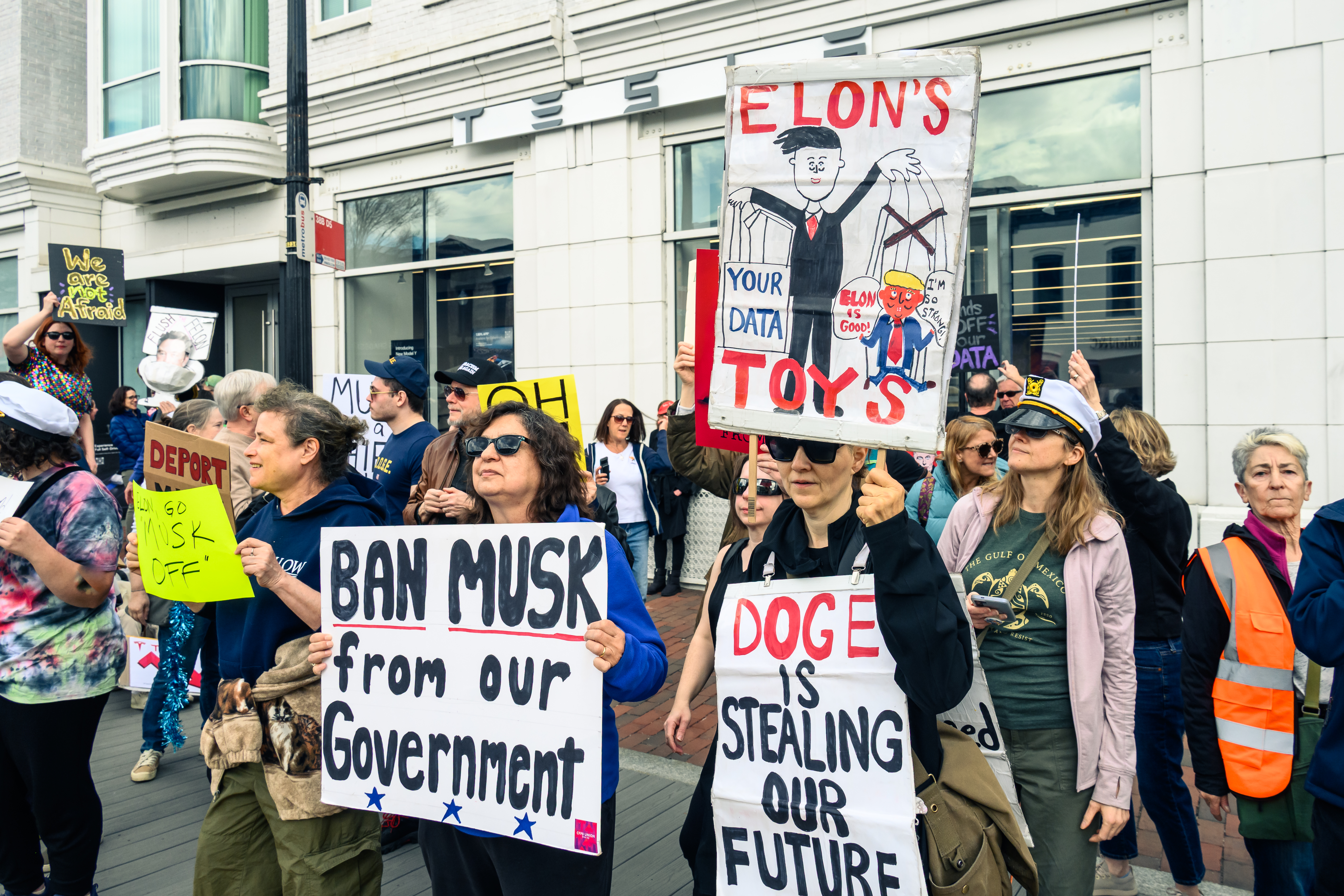
Some of the protests are in response to the political views and actions by Elon Musk as he works both in the federal government as a special government employee while also running Tesla and other corporations.

In mid-February it was reported that Tesla owners were selling their vehicles in protest, with 31% of polled Tesla drivers saying that Musk's actions had led to them selling or considering selling their car. On March 14, Senator Mark Kelly posted a video on Twitter stating that he would also be selling his Tesla due to his opinion of Musk.

One person was arrested after a Molotov cocktail was thrown at a Tesla store in Loveland, Colorado, on March 7. A second person had been charged with vandalizing the same store earlier in the month, though police said the incidents appeared to be unrelated to one another.

On March 22, a chapter of Indivisible organized a protest outside a Tesla store in Milford, Connecticut; around 300 people were seen at it. Senator Richard Blumenthal spoke at the protest, asking them to continue and praising Senator Chuck Schumer.

== Response ==
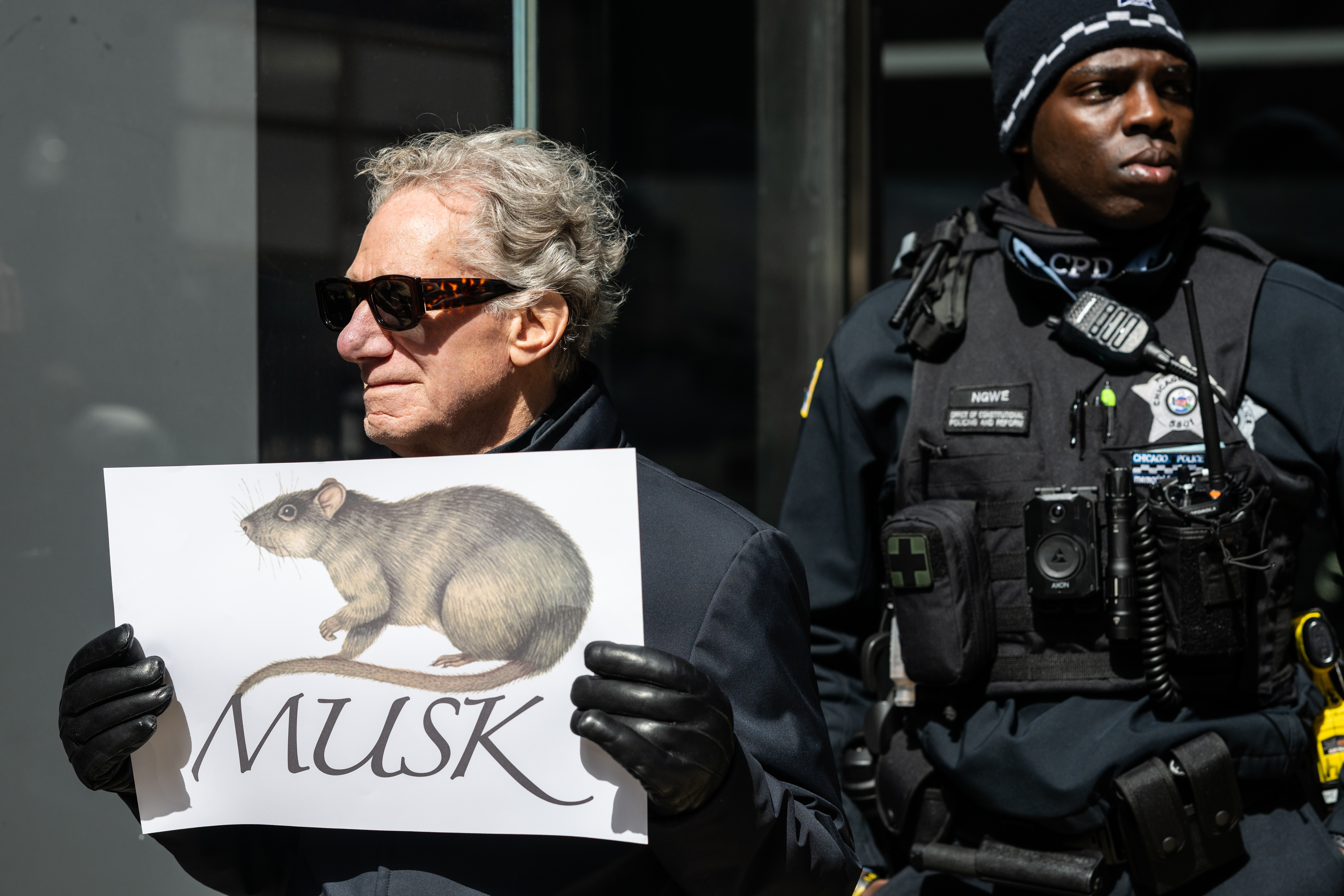
One of the protesters at a Chicago Tesla store. Some Tesla stores have responded to the ongoing protests by having extra security to ensure the protests remain peaceful.

Musk responded to the protests with an X post on March 9 accusing Valerie Costa of "committing crimes", which led to harassment of the activist. On March 11 Donald Trump arranged a promotional press briefing in front of the White House, featuring a number of Tesla vehicles and Musk, stating he would buy a Tesla. Trump also said he would classify people who vandalize Tesla cars or trucks as domestic terrorists. Trump has previously expressed strong opposition to electric vehicles; in September 2023, speaking at Drake Enterprises in Michigan, Trump had claimed EVs would "spell the death of the US auto industry" and stated "I'm not a person that wants to go all electric, I think it's going to be very bad for the country."

Musk and supporters have alleged that Tesla Takedown protesters are being paid to participate, though no evidence has been provided in support of the claims. Public Radio Tulsa reported that a local man offered to "compensate people who showed up as counter-protesters", although no one reported being paid.

Fox News host Sean Hannity said on March 10 that he would be buying a Tesla Model S, and that he would run a sweepstake in which people could win a Tesla vehicle.

== See also ==
- 2025 United States boycott
  - 2025 Canadian boycott of the United States
  - Economic Blackout
- Criticism of Tesla, Inc.
  - Elon Musk's Crash Course
  - Everyone Hates Elon
  - TSLAQ
- DogeQuest
- List of lawsuits involving Tesla, Inc.
- Protests against Elon Musk
- 2025 Tesla vandalism
- Tesla and unions
- Timeline of protests against Donald Trump
- 50501 protests
