= Swasticar =

Nickname for cars manufactured by Tesla

Swasticar is a nickname for cars manufactured by Tesla, Inc. It is a neologism created by replacing the last two letters of "swastika" – a symbol of Nazi Germany – with "car". It is intended to disparage the social views and political activities of Tesla CEO Elon Musk.

== History ==
In late February 2025, a poster appeared at a bus stop in Bethnal Green, a suburb of London. The poster featured Tesla CEO Elon Musk in a Tesla car, making a gesture resembling a Nazi salute, accompanied by the slogans "From 0 to 1939 in 3 seconds (Note: This is believed to be a play on words based on a term describing a car's acceleration, used to represent the sudden leap from a state of zero (nothing) into an era like that of 1939, when Germany invaded Poland and World War II broke out.)" and "Tesla, the swasticar." A British non-profit organization called "Everyone Hates Elon" claimed to have created the poster.

On February 27 of the same year, "Everyone Hates Elon" posted photos and videos of the poster on Instagram and TikTok with the hashtag "#dontbuyaswasticar". The post quickly went viral as it was shared by many users.

The group brought life-size cutouts of Elon Musk making a Nazi salute-like pose to numerous Tesla showrooms and distributed stickers throughout London that read "Don't buy a swasticar."

== Background ==
Prior to this, Elon Musk had repeatedly criticized top European politicians, while also openly expressing support for far-right parties and politicians in Europe, particularly the Alternative for Germany (AfD), and had called for people to vote for the party, which is seen as having pro-Nazi leanings. Tesla's sales in the European market in January 2025 had fallen to about half of what they had been in 2024.

During a rally celebrating U.S. president Donald Trump's second inauguration at the Capital One Arena on January 20, 2025, he repeatedly made gestures resembling the Nazi salute, drawing criticism, but his supporters defended them as the "Roman salute."

On January 22, an image of a masked figure giving the inauguration salute, along with the words "Heil Tesla" in the same font as the Tesla car logo, were projected onto the wall of Tesla's Berlin factory by two unrelated groups using projection mapping.

Immediately after the inauguration, he became head of the Department of Government Efficiency (DOGE) under Donald Trump and began attempting to carry out mass layoffs of U.S. federal employees through a hardline approach.

== Influence ==
Tesla owners who use their cars as personal vehicles have begun to consider selling or donating them because the cars' reputation has declined, leading to taunts from others and incidents such as notes labeled "Nazi car" being stuck to their vehicles.

In the United States, supporters of the anti-Musk movement "#SmashTesla," which began around the same time, quickly adopted the swasticar hashtag in their social media posts.

The boycott against Tesla escalated further, with flyers featuring a masked man making a Nazi salute and reading "Sell your swasticar!" being posted on lampposts and other public places throughout the San Francisco Bay Area, urging Tesla owners to sell their vehicles.

In the United States, car insurance premiums are generally on the rise, but there have also been reports of vandalism, such as large red swastikas painted on Tesla vehicles, and vandalism is concentrated on Tesla cars, raising concerns that if this trend continues, insurance premiums for Tesla vehicles could rise.
