= Wedding of Jeff Bezos and Lauren Sánchez =

2025 wedding in Venice, Italy

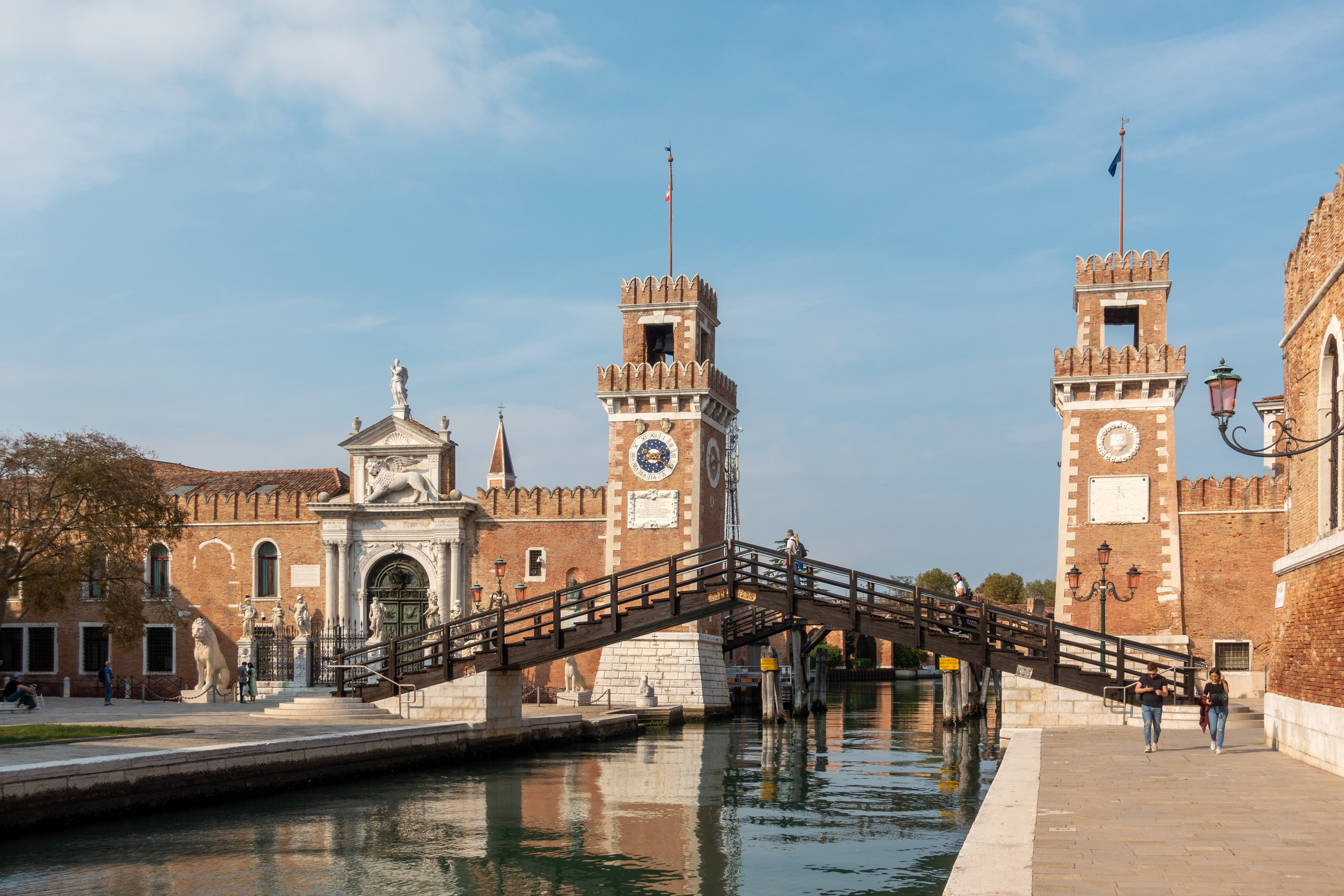
- The Venetian Arsenal, where the celebrations took place
- Date: June 27, 2025
- Venue: San Giorgio Maggiore; Venetian Arsenal
- Location: Venice, Italy
- Participants: Jeff Bezos; Lauren Sánchez

The wedding of American businessman Jeff Bezos and media personality Lauren Sánchez took place in Venice, Italy, between June 26–28, 2025. The multi-day event, held at various historic sites across the city, drew significant media attention due to its high-profile guest list, lavish celebrations, and extensive security measures. It also sparked local protests and criticism from Venetian activists over the city's commercialization and use as a venue for private luxury events.

== Background ==
Businessman Jeff Bezos was married to MacKenzie Scott from 1993 until their divorce in 2019. Lauren Sánchez was married to Patrick Whitesell from 2005 to 2019. Bezos and Scott have four children, while Sánchez and Whitesell have two children together.

== Engagement ==
Bezos proposed to Sánchez while on holiday in the south of France in 2023. He proposed with an engagement ring featuring a large pink diamond in a cushion cut, set on a platinum band. The diamond is estimated to weigh 30 carats (6.0 g) and to have cost between $3–5 million.

An engagement party was held on Bezos's yacht, Koru, on the Amalfi Coast, two months after the proposal. Guests reportedly included Leonardo DiCaprio, Bill Gates, Whitney Wolfe Herd, Kris Jenner, Wendi Murdoch, Sarah Staudinger, and Queen Rania of Jordan.

A second engagement party was held for the couple at the home of their friends Barry Diller and Diane von Furstenberg in Beverly Hills.

== Wedding ==
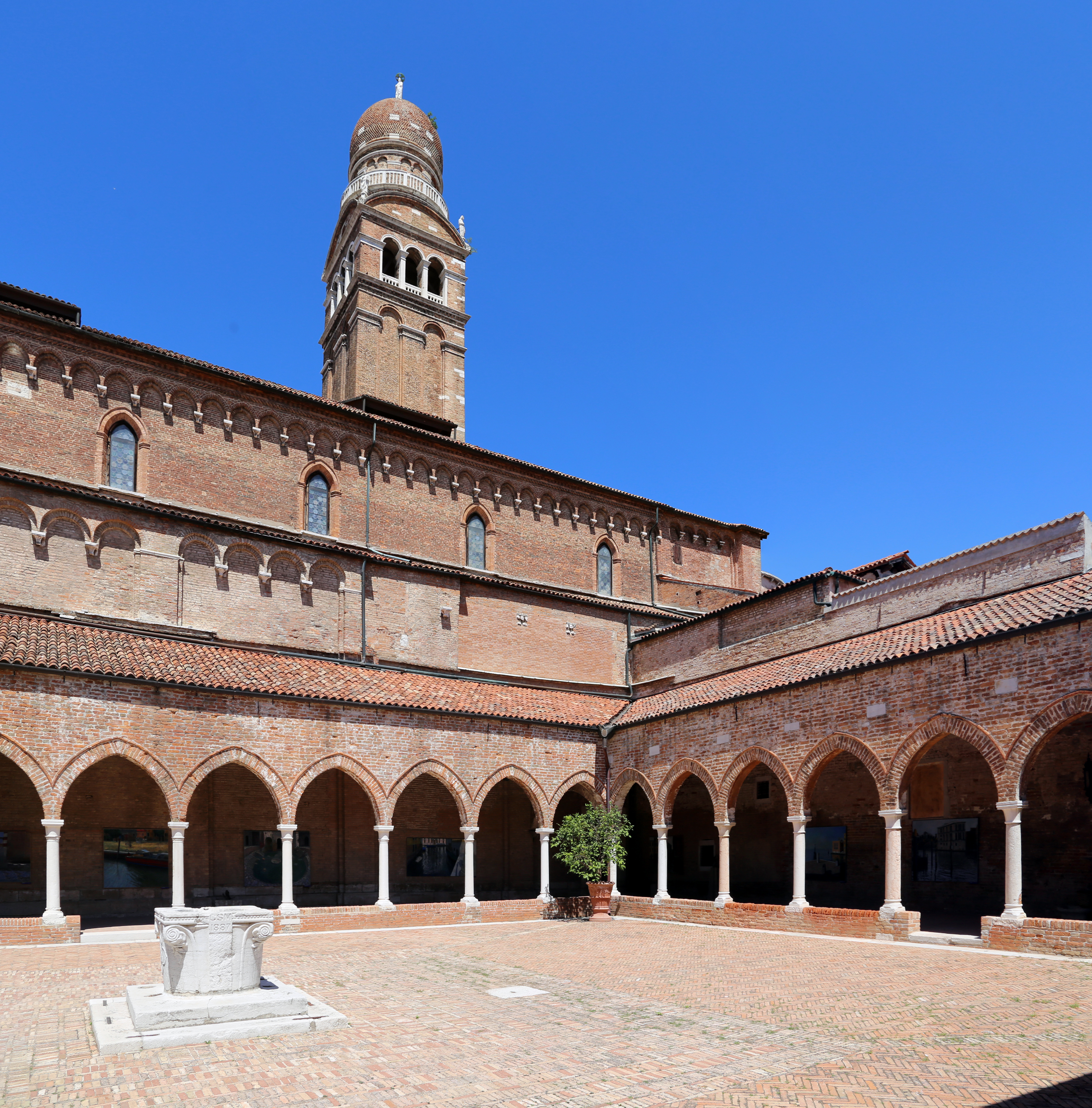
A party was held prior to the wedding in the cloisters of the Madonna dell'Orto church

The wedding took place in Venice on June 27, 2025, with the couple exchanging vows at the basilica of San Giorgio Maggiore on the island of the same name. Matteo Bocelli was expected to perform at the ceremony. Other parties held as part of the celebrations included a party themed around The Great Gatsby, a pyjama party, and a foam party. Sánchez reportedly had 27 outfits for the extended nuptials. The couple was staying at the Aman Venice hotel, in the former Palazzo Papadopoli. A party on the Thursday prior to the wedding was held in the cloisters of the Madonna dell'Orto in the district of the city.

The Mayor of Venice, Luigi Brugnaro, said that the event would "bring economic returns of millions of euros" to the city. Writing in The Daily Telegraph, Nick Squires stated that it would be "a bonanza for hoteliers, restaurant owners, water taxi drivers, and gondoliers" and the most significant celebrity wedding in Venice since the wedding of George Clooney and Amal Alamuddin in 2015. The event was organized by the event planners Lanza & Baucina. Potential venues for the wedding included the Doge's Palace, the Venetian Arsenal, and the Fondazione Cini on San Giorgio Maggiore.

During the ceremony, Jeff Bezos and Lauren Sanchez likely exchanged rings symbolically, but it remains unclear when the couple legally wed (or if they already have, in the US).

Italian media reported that several top hotels in Venice were fully booked, including the Hotel Cipriani, Hotel Danieli, and Palazzo Pisani Gritti. Every one of Venice's water taxis had also reportedly been reserved to transport guests.

The couple donated 2 million euros to a project studying the lagoons of the Veneto region.

== Guests ==
Between 200 and 250 guests were expected to attend. Ninety private jets brought guests to Marco Polo Airport, generating an expected revenue of €48 million. Guests included Tom Brady, Tony Gonzalez, Sam Altman, Ted Sarandos, Ari Emanuel, Jerry Seinfeld, Usher, Bill Gates, Leonardo DiCaprio, Tobey Maguire, Andrew Garfield, Mick Jagger, Oprah Winfrey, Barbra Streisand, Ellie Goulding, Kim Kardashian, Khloé Kardashian, Kendall Jenner, Eva Longoria, Ivanka Trump, Peter Attia, Lauren Santo Domingo and Hussein, Crown Prince of Jordan among others.

== Local opposition and protest ==
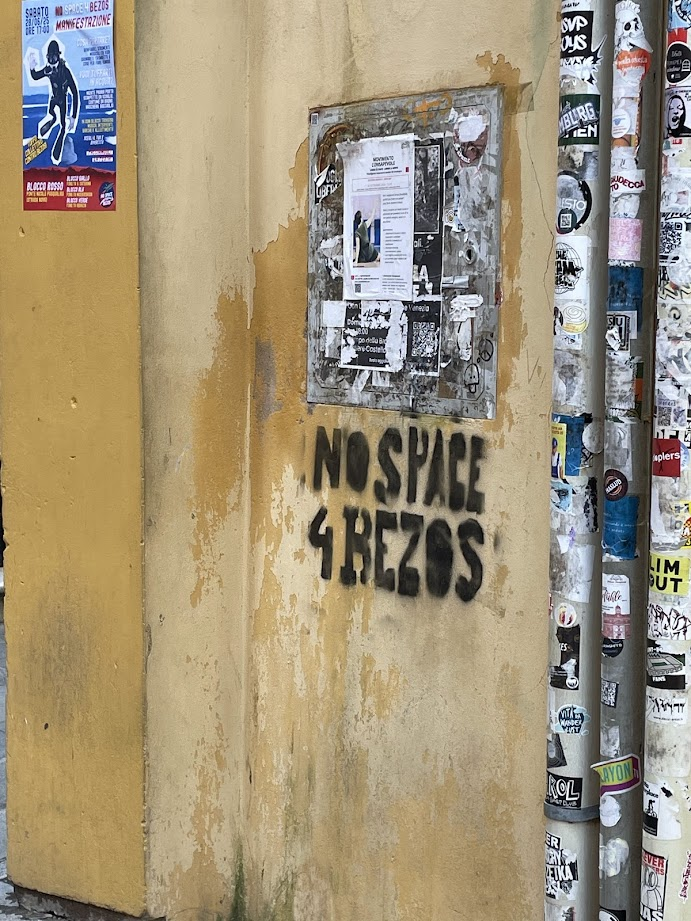
Graffiti opposing the Bezoses wedding

The wedding attracted opposition and protests from Venetians. An activist from the group No Space for Bezos stated that the wedding was "...the symbol of the exploitation of the city by outsiders... Venice is now just an asset" and that "Venice is being treated like a showcase, a stage." The group hung banners from the Rialto Bridge and the bell tower of San Giorgio Maggiore. Activists had planned to protest at the Scuola vecchia della Misericordia, where the wedding celebrations were due to be held, by filling the canal with inflatable crocodiles. The venue was moved to the Venetian Arsenal in the Castello district, which was described by Reuters as "surrounded by water and impossible to reach by land when connecting bridges are raised." The venue was also purportedly changed due to heightened security following the Twelve-Day War and the expected attendance of Ivanka Trump, daughter of the president of the United States, Donald Trump.

In addition to protests organised by local groups, activists from Greenpeace and British political campaign group Everyone Hates Elon unfurled a large banner in Piazza San Marco on June 23; the banner featured an image of Bezos laughing, along with the slogan "If you can rent Venice for your wedding you can pay more tax." A statement from the two groups explained that although Bezos is one of the wealthiest people in the world, he "is reported to pay a 1.1% true tax rate", and that the aim of the protest was to highlight the comparatively low tax contributions of billionaires, who nonetheless "exacerbat[e] the climate crisis with environmentally unsustainable lifestyles". The banner was soon removed by local police.
