= 2025 Tesla vandalism =

Vandalism of Tesla vehicles and property

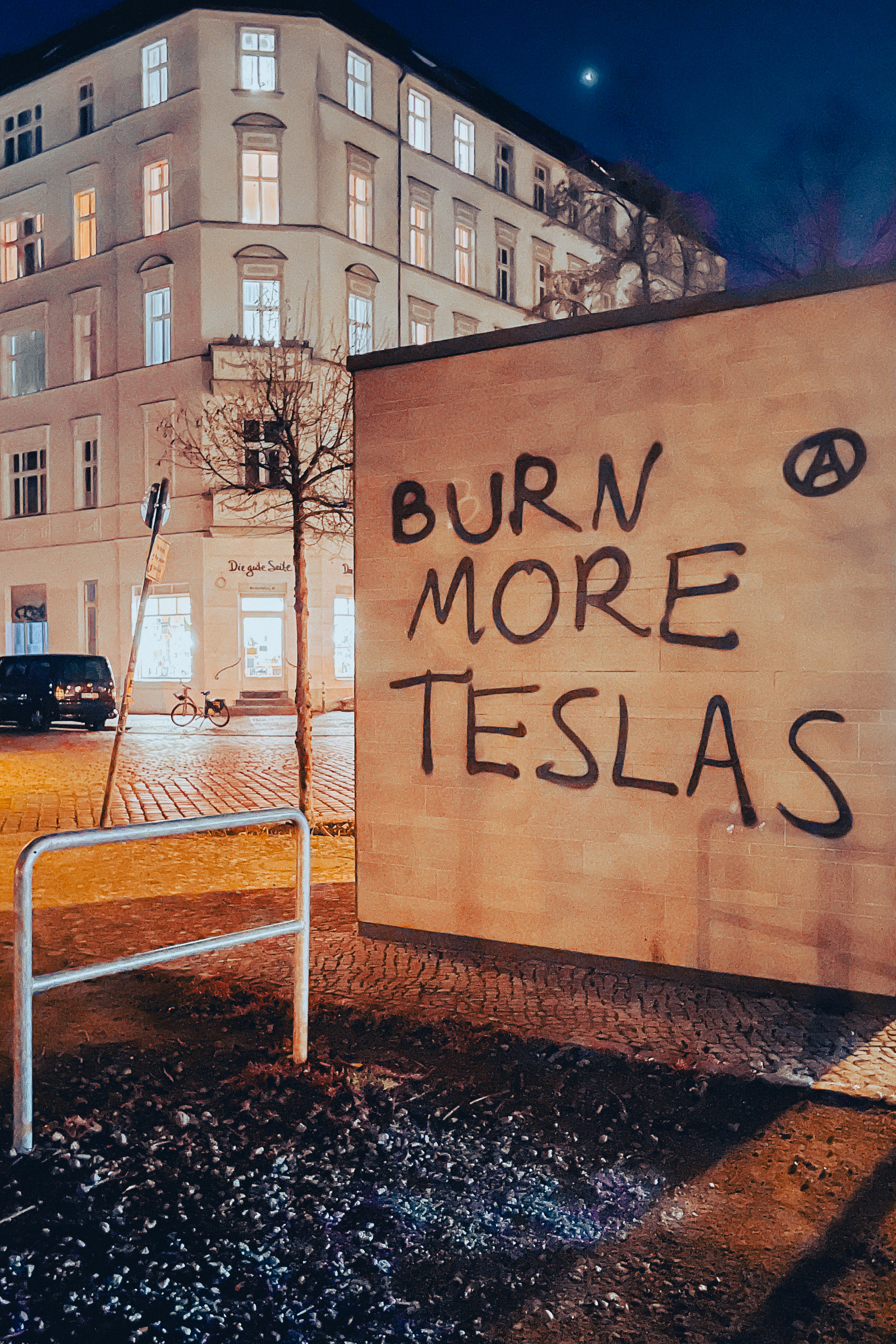
"Burn More Teslas" graffiti with circle-A in Berlin, January 2025

Beginning in early 2025, there has been an increased number of incidents of vandalism targeting Tesla property, including vehicles, dealerships, and charging stations. The incidents have been part of a larger wave of protests against Elon Musk, Tesla's owner and a key figure of the Department of Government Efficiency (DOGE). The majority of incidents have occurred in the United States, but they have also been reported in Canada, France, Germany, the United Kingdom, and New Zealand.

The Federal Bureau of Investigation (FBI) and the Attorney General Pam Bondi have labeled the vandalism as domestic terrorism and President Donald Trump suggested the perpetrators be sent to prison in El Salvador. Although Musk has suggested that the vandalism is funded and coordinated, the FBI and Bureau of Alcohol, Tobacco, Firearms, and Explosives said they could not find any evidence that attacks have been coordinated.

== Incidents ==
=== United States ===
==== Midwest ====
A woman was arrested for spray-painting a Tesla dealership in Buffalo Grove, Illinois. A Tesla owner in Wichita, Kansas, reported a man keying her vehicle outside a restaurant. Several Cybertrucks were set on fire at a dealership in Kansas City, Missouri. In Bloomington, Minnesota, a woman was filmed keying a Tesla in a parking lot. Authorities decided not to move forward with criminal charges after the woman turned herself in and agreed to pay for damages. A Tesla was also keyed in West Fargo, North Dakota, and a suspect was arrested.

In west Michigan, a Cybertruck owner reported someone spray-painted "FUCK OFF NAZI" on the side of his vehicle in early March. In Kentwood, five Cybertrucks were vandalized on March 10, with one having the words "Nazis always lose" spray-painted on the side.

==== Northeast ====
Several Tesla chargers were set on fire outside a shopping center in Littleton, Massachusetts, on March 3. In a Dedham dealership, two Cybertrucks were spray-painted, and a Model S had all of its tires punctured. The same dealership had been targeted by vandalism on February 26. In Brookline, a man was arrested for allegedly placing Elon Musk-related stickers on Teslas.

A Tesla owner in Syracuse, New York, reported an unidentified person wrote "This car supports Nazis" on his car while he was in a theater. On March 6, two men in New York City spray-painted swastikas on a Cybertruck in Lower Manhattan. The New York City Police Department said they were investigating the vandalism as a hate crime.

In Pennsylvania on March 23, a Tesla Cybertruck was vandalized while parked outside a restaurant in Newtown Township, Bucks County by an apparent juvenile who dragged something along the side of it, leaving a mark.

==== South ====
A Tesla dealership in Owings Mills, Maryland, was spray-painted on March 2, the day after a protest was held outside the same dealership. In Washington, D.C., police said they were looking for a man and woman who had graffitied at least two Teslas with unspecified "political hate speech". The word "NAZI" was found etched on the side of a Tesla in Garner, North Carolina. Police in Tulsa, Oklahoma reported that a masked individual spray-painted the word "NAZI" on the side of a Cybertruck.

In North Charleston, South Carolina, federal authorities charged a man with arson after he allegedly set Tesla chargers on fire with Molotov cocktails. The suspect is also accused of spray-painting "Fuck Trump, long live Ukraine" next to the chargers. On March 24, Austin Police Department responded to calls of suspicious devices found in the local Tesla showroom, the Austin Bomb Squad determined the devices to be incendiary devices . On March 25, a man in Texarkana, Texas was arrested and charged with a felony for vandalizing several Teslas. Video from one of the cars appeared to show the suspect driving a mini four-wheeler into the side of a Tesla parked outside a restaurant.

On March 29, a woman in Aventura, Florida was arrested and charged with felony criminal mischief for sticking a wad of gum to the door handle of a Tesla, an event which the vehicle's owner characterized as a result of "unfortunately, a divide in our country where certain views that are not accepted by a subset".

==== West ====
On April 6, a man slashed the tire of a Tesla parked outside a grocery store in Clovis. In San Jose, police arrested a man who was seen on video keying a Tesla. A dealership and several vehicles in Encinitas were spray-painted with swastikas. In Vista, a person reportedly broke the side-view mirror of a Tesla parked in a driveway. In Berkeley, a person was filmed spray-painting a Tesla in a Whole Foods Market parking lot. On March 29, a Cybertruck parked outside a home in Novato was vandalized, with a suspect slitting the tires and throwing a rock at the windshield.

One person was arrested after a molotov cocktail was thrown at a Tesla dealership in Loveland, Colorado, on March 7. A second person had been charged with vandalizing the same dealership earlier in the month, though a police said the incidents appeared to be unrelated. Police in Colorado Springs said they had responded to two reports of Tesla vehicles being vandalized in 2025.

Sometime on the night of April 2 and 3, 16 Cybertrucks and a dealership were spray-painted in Meridian, Idaho.

In Nevada, multiple Teslas were set on fire at a dealership in Enterprise. The Federal Bureau of Investigation said they were investigating. A 36-year-old Las Vegas man was arrested and charged with federal offenses.

In Salem, Oregon, a Tesla vehicle was set on fire in a dealership parking lot in January. The following month, several gunshots were fired at the windows of the same dealership. A suspect was arrested and faces federal charges. A dealership in Tigard was also damaged by gunfire in March. A security guard was present, but they were not injured. In Portland, a person spray-painted the word "Nazi" on a Tesla. In Eugene, the words "Divest" and "Depose" were spray-painted on two Tesla vehicles. In Portland, Oregon, a man was arrested for trying to blind Tesla employees with a laser pointer.

In Washington, four Cybertrucks were damaged by a fire in Seattle in March. An explosion occurred at a Tesla supercharger station located in Lacey in April.

On March 22, four Tesla chargers in Rock Springs, Wyoming, were spray-painted with swastikas.

=== Canada ===
In Vancouver, police arrested a man suspected of vandalizing a Tesla dealership multiple times between January 1 and March 21, spray-painting obscenities on the building. In Montreal, police arrested two members of an activist group who sprayed paint on a dealership.

On March 17, a Tesla Model S parked in a test drive spot reserved for a showroom inside Masonville Place in London, Ontario, was set on fire; no injuries were reported. March 18, a Tesla car was burned in southeast Calgary. March 19, a Tesla Cybertruck was burned in Calgary. On March 20, 80 Teslas were damaged at a dealership in Hamilton, Ontario, with cars having deep scratches and tires punctured.

February 13 and March 31 Tesla vehicles were vandalized in Victoria, Canada. In Vancouver, there have been 28 acts of vandalism against Teslas, charging stations and car dealerships since January (as of April 1). On April 3 a pregnant woman was injured after a rock was thrown at her Tesla.

=== France ===
Around a dozen Teslas were set on fire outside a dealership in Toulouse on February 23. Eight cars were destroyed and another four were damaged.

Several Tesla Superchargers were set on fire in Saint-Chamond. The police said two chargers were completely destroyed, while the others were damaged.

A dozen burnings of Teslas have happened from January 2025 to April 2025 in Deux-Sèvres.

=== Other countries ===
Seven Teslas were destroyed after catching on fire outside a dealership in Ottersberg, Germany, around 3:30 a.m. on March 29, a worldwide day of action announced by the Tesla Takedown movement. Seventeen Tesla vehicles were damaged in a fire at a store in Rome.

In New Zealand, several Tesla cars were spray painted in Auckland. Members of Just Stop Oil poured an orange liquid latex over a Tesla robot at a store in London.

== Response ==
=== Government officials ===
In a Truth Social post, President Trump suggested people who vandalized Teslas should be sent to prisons in El Salvador, the same country where the United States had recently sent hundreds of migrants. Trump also claimed, without evidence, that "people that are very highly political on the left" were paying the vandals.

Attorney General Pam Bondi described Tesla vandalism as "nothing short of domestic terrorism" and vowed to "impose severe consequences on those involved in these attacks, including those operating behind the scenes to coordinate and fund these crimes".

Elon Musk said those vandalizing cars should "stop being psycho" and called Tesla a "peaceful company". He said he believed there was a "mental illness thing going on", and suggested that the perpetrators were being led by a "larger force" who were funding and coordinating the violence. He also referred to the acts as "trans violence" and claimed that "the probability of a trans person being violent appears to be vastly higher".

Law enforcement and domestic terrorism experts have found no evidence that the attacks are coordinated.

On March 24, the Federal Bureau of Investigation (FBI) launched an investigation task force. The director of the FBI, Kash Patel, has called the attacks "domestic terrorism". Bruce Hoffman, senior fellow for counterterrorism and homeland security at the Council on Foreign Relations, agreed with the classification of terrorism by saying "It's absolutely domestic terrorism. Vandalism is a crime that if it's committed with a political motive, can certainly be defined as terrorism."

=== Insurance companies ===
After increasing losses due to an increase in vandalism, insurance companies have suggested their rates could rise to insure Tesla vehicles. Compared to the average rise in cost of 10% to insure US vehicles, the Model Y has risen 29% and the Model 3 has risen 24% from 2024 to 2025. The average cost to insure Model Y and 3 increased $300 and $101, respectively, from January to March 2025.

=== Other ===
In March 2025, the Vancouver International Auto Show removed Tesla from its lineup due to safety concerns.

The April 5, 2025, episode of Saturday Night Live referenced the increase in vandalism in its cold open, with Musk, played by Mike Myers, blaming his own unpopularity for the situation and introducing a "fully self-vandalizing" Tesla vehicle that includes "AI-powered graffiti" of swastikas and penises. Musk responded to the sketch in a post on X, giving his view that the show "hasn't been funny in a long time".
