= Joan Donovan =

American social scientist and academic

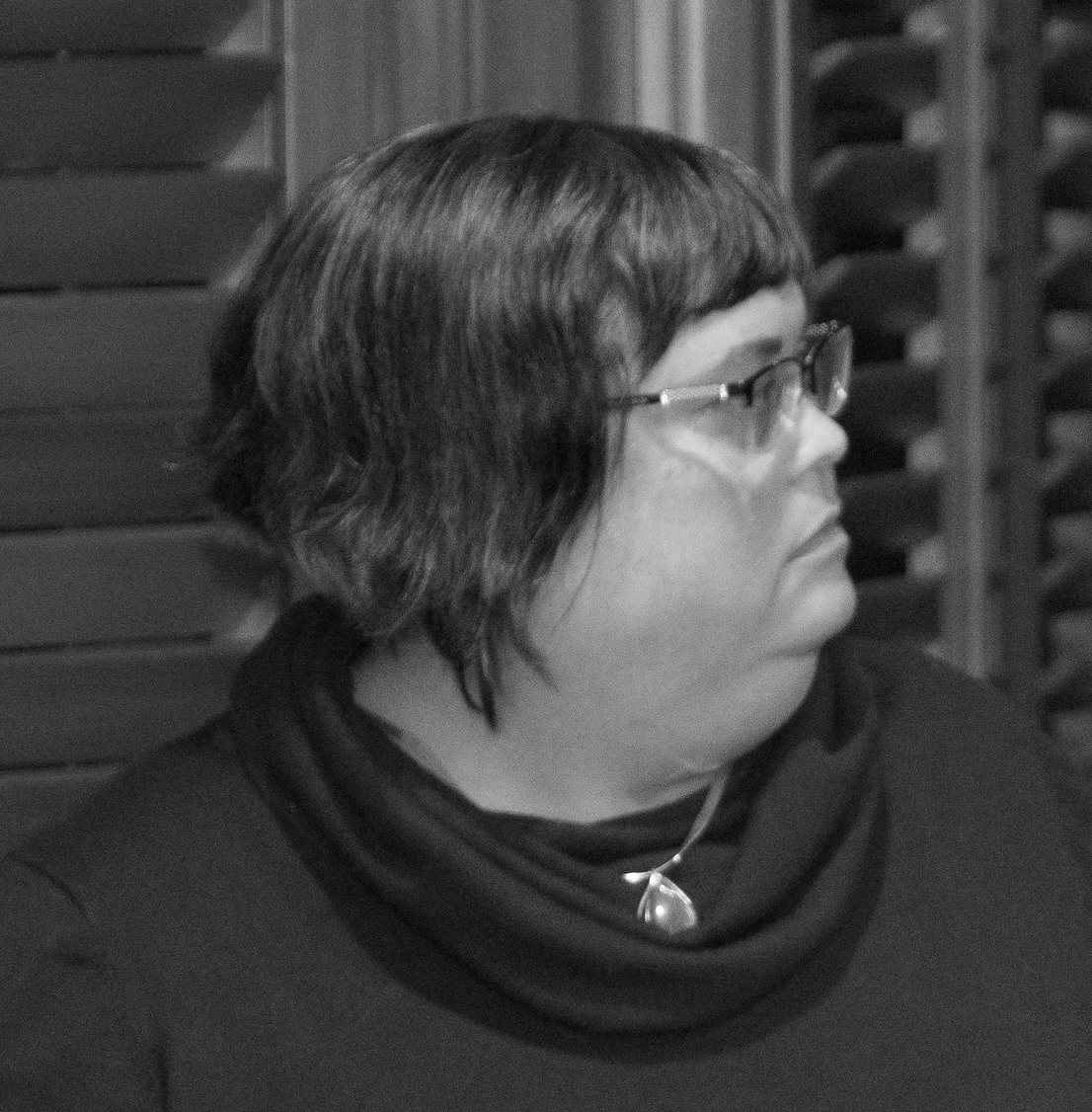
- Donovan in 2023
- Born: 1979 or 1980 (age 46–47)
- Education: Northeastern University; University of Massachusetts, Boston; Concordia University (BA, MA); University of California, San Diego (PhD)
- Occupations: Sociologist; academic
- Employers: Harvard University; Boston University
- Known for: Disinformation expert

Joan Donovan (born 1979/1980) is an American social science researcher, sociologist, and academic noted for her research on disinformation. She is the founder of a nonprofit, The Critical Internet Studies Institute (CISI). Since 2023, she is an assistant professor at the College of Communication at Boston University.

Prior to that, Donovan was a researcher and lecturer at the Harvard Kennedy School at Harvard University. She was also an affiliate at Data and Society, and was research director of the Technology and Social Change Research Project at the Shorenstein Center on Media, Politics, and Public Policy.

== Education ==
Donovan earned her Ph.D. in sociology and science studies from the University of California, San Diego. She was a post-doctoral fellow at the Institute for Society and Genetics at University of California, Los Angeles, where her research focus was social movements, technology, and the use of DNA ancestry tests by white supremacists.

== Career ==
She later held the role of research lead for the Media Manipulation Initiative at Data and Society, an independent nonprofit research institute, that mapped how interest groups, governments, political operatives, corporations, and others use the internet and media to disrupt social institutions.

After Data and Society, Donovan went on to Harvard Kennedy School, leading its Technology and Social Change Research Project and teaching a class entitled, Media Manipulation and Disinformation Campaigns.

In September 2023, she was hired as a tenure-track faculty member by the Boston University College of Communication and given the title of assistant professor.

=== Areas of research ===
Donovan's expertise is in examining internet and technology studies, online extremism, media manipulation, and disinformation campaigns. In January 2020, she testified at the "Americans at Risk: Manipulation and Deception in the Digital Age" hearing held by the House Committee on Energy and Commerce's Subcommittee on Consumer Protection and Commerce.

As research director of the Harvard project, she published a number of impactful research papers and books. Donovan co-authored a widely-read study that demonstrated that a significant number of participants in the January 6 attack on the Capitol were driven by their support for Donald Trump.

In September 2021, Donovan released a book entitled, Meme Wars: The Untold Story of the Online Battles Upending Democracy in America, with co-authors Emily Dreyfuss and Brian Friedberg. The book explores the spread of right-wing political conspiracy theories through online media.

In 2022, Harvard announced that her research project there would end in 2024. Due to announcement of the closing of the project, she accepted a faculty position at Boston University. The Harvard project ended in August 2023, and Donovan began her work at Boston University in September 2023.

On January 5, 2024, The Conversation published "Jan. 6 was an example of networked incitement − a media and disinformation expert explains the danger of political violence orchestrated over social media" by Donovan following research into the weaponization of social media that influenced the January 6 insurrection at the United States Capitol in Washington, D.C., in 2020 and compared its dynamics to events in previous decades.

=== Whistleblower disclosure ===
In December 2023, Donovan alleged that she was forced to leave Harvard due to pressure from Meta Platforms resulting from her research about online extremism. In a legal filing sent to both the Massachusetts Attorney General's office as well as the federal United States Department of Education, Donovan alleged that financial pressure from the Chan Zuckerberg Initiative led to her being pushed out of Harvard. The Chan Zuckerberg Initiative denied involvement in her departure from the university. Harvard also disputed Donovan's accusation. Harvard asserted that they did not "fire" her but that they were unable to find a faculty member who would oversee the work project and, though the director of the work, she was not employed as "faculty." They asserted they offered her a part-time position as an adjunct lecturer, which she turned down.

== Criticism and scrutiny ==
In 2024, The Chronicle of Higher Education published an investigative article titled "The Distortions of Joan Donovan", which examined Donovan’s public account of her departure from Harvard University’s Kennedy School of Government and the closure of the Technology and Social Change Project. The article reported that Donovan had publicly alleged that Harvard ended her role and research program due to pressure from the technology company Meta (formerly Facebook).

According to the investigation, multiple former colleagues and staff members disputed Donovan’s characterization of events. Eleven former members of the Technology and Social Change Project told The Chronicle that they had seen no evidence that Meta exerted pressure on Harvard to terminate the project, and that Donovan’s claims of corporate interference were not supported by internal records, correspondence, or firsthand accounts reviewed by the publication.

The article further reported that some former associates described Donovan’s public statements as misleading or contradicted by documented communications, and stated that they no longer trusted her representations of the circumstances surrounding the project’s closure.

Harvard Kennedy School officials also denied Donovan’s claims, with a spokesperson stating that allegations of donor or corporate influence over research decisions were false, and that the winding down of the project followed standard university policies, including requirements that research centers be led by appointed faculty members.

== Bibliography ==
Donovan has authored more than 35 articles, papers, and books including:

- How news organizations should cover white supremacist shootings, PBS NewsHour
- Big Tech Companies Are Struggling With How To Best Police Their Platforms, NPR
- Unlike Us Reader: Social Media Monopolies and Their Alternatives, Institute of Network Cultures
- Navigating the Tech Stack: When, Where, and How Should we Moderate Content?, Centre for International Governance Innovation
- Toward a Militant Ethnography of Infrastructure: Cybercartographies of Order, Scale, and Scope across the Occupy Movement, Journal of Contemporary Ethnography
- Meme Wars: The Untold Story of the Online Battles Upending Democracy in America, Bloomsbury Publishing
- Jan. 6 was an example of networked incitement − a media and disinformation expert explains the danger of political violence orchestrated over social media, The Conversation
