= Elon Musk salute controversy =

2025 American political controversy

- Part of the second inauguration of Donald Trump
- Musk's salute during the second inauguration of Donald Trump. He says, "And I just want to say thank you for making it happen. Thank you. [Gestures.] My heart goes out to you. It is thanks to you that the future of civilization is assured."
- Date: January 20, 2025; 22 months ago
- Venue: Capital One Arena
- Location: Washington, D.C.
- Type: Stiff-arm gesture
- Participants: Elon Musk
- Outcome: Calls from European political parties for Musk to be banned from their countries including Germany

On January 20, 2025, while speaking at a rally celebrating U.S. president Donald Trump's second inauguration, businessman and political figure Elon Musk twice made a salute interpreted by many as a fascist Roman salute. (Note: The "Roman salute" is a gesture which was used by Italian fascists, then adopted by the Nazis. It is not believed to have been used by ancient Romans.)

It was widely described as an intentional Nazi salute in Germany, where making such gestures is illegal. The Anti-Defamation League initially said it was "an awkward gesture in a moment of enthusiasm, not a Nazi salute", and Israeli prime minister Benjamin Netanyahu said Musk was being "falsely smeared", but other Jewish organizations disagreed and condemned the salute. American public opinion was divided on partisan lines as to whether it was a fascist salute, with Musk himself saying it was not. Musk dismissed the accusations of Nazi sympathies, deriding them as "dirty tricks" and a "tired" attack. Neo-Nazi and white supremacist groups celebrated it as a Nazi salute. Left-wing parties in Germany and Austria called for Musk to be barred from entering their countries.

== Inauguration, speech, and gestures ==
Musk's full speech at the ceremony, where he gives the gesture, see 1:16 to 1:30

On January 20, 2025, the second inauguration of Donald Trump took place after his victory in the 2024 United States presidential election. Many people were invited, including Elon Musk. Musk was influential to Trump's campaign as the second-largest donor. Trump designated him to co-head the Department of Government Efficiency during Trump's second presidency.

After the inauguration, Musk attended a celebratory rally at Capital One Arena in Washington, D.C., where he thanked the attendees for voting for Trump. Musk jumped onto the stage, started throwing his hands in the air, and then began to dance. After he finished dancing, Musk placed his hand to his heart and extended his arm out above his head with his palm facing down, making a straight-arm gesture. He then turned around and repeated the gesture to the audience behind him. He then said: "My heart goes out to you. It is thanks to you that the future of civilization is assured" after he finished the gestures. My heart goes out to you is a phrase typically used to show "sorrow or sympathy" for someone, rather than an expression of thanks.

== Reactions ==
=== United States ===
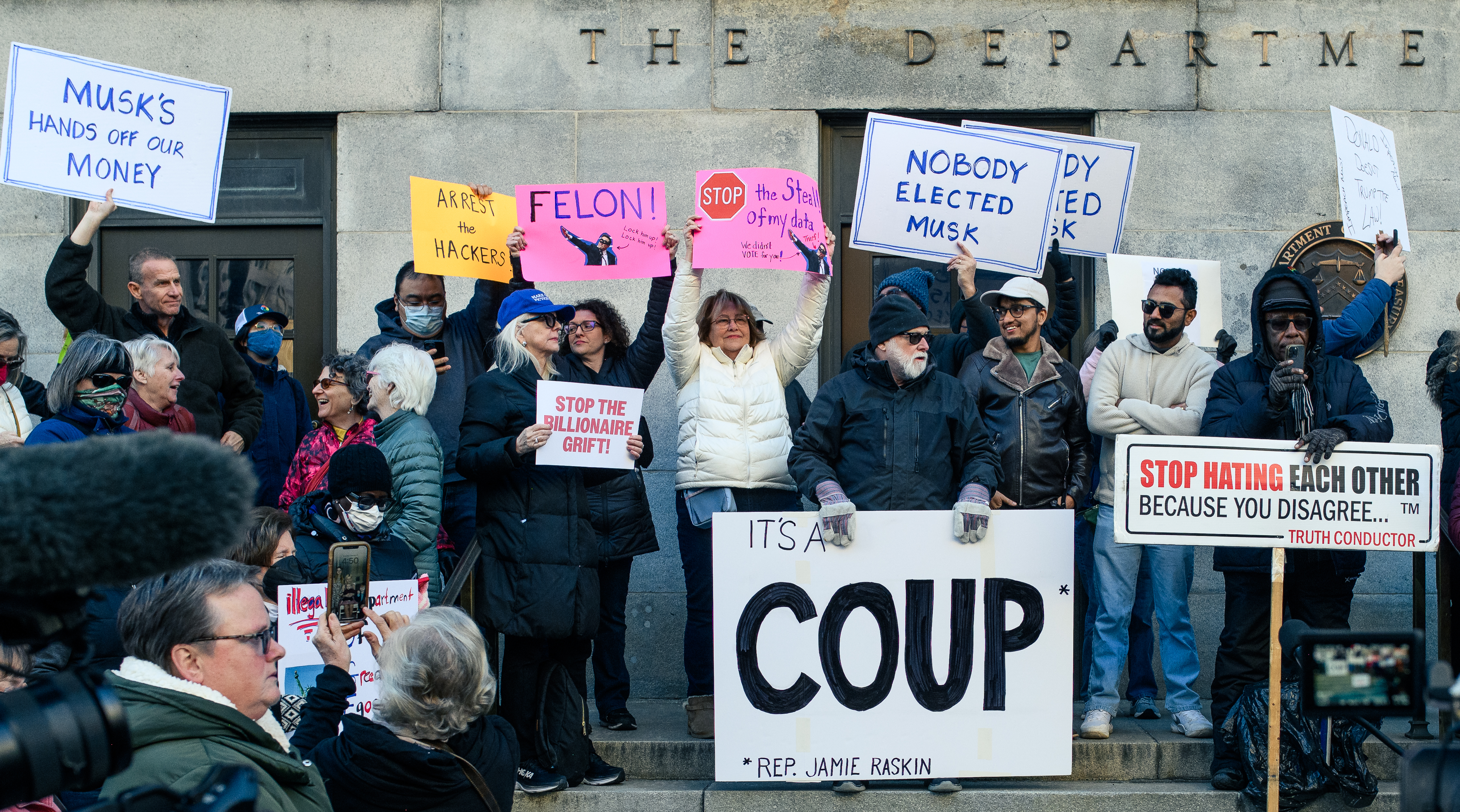
Protest at the Department of Treasury; in the center, two women can be seen holding signs with Musk's gesture, calling him a felon and a thief.

The incident quickly sparked online comparisons to the Nazi salute. While watching the rally, CNN anchor Erin Burnett said that the action was "striking". Some commentators, including historian Aaron Astor and Newsweek opinion editor Batya Ungar-Sargon, attributed the gesture to autism; Musk has said he has Asperger's syndrome. Several autistic people and therapists interviewed by journalist James McNaney of the Belfast Telegraph have objected to the notion that being on the autism spectrum would cause Musk to make this gesture. In an article for The New York Times, Berlin bureau chief Katrin Bennhold wrote that "it looked a lot like the salute used in Germany and fascist Italy" but that "a striking number of different interpretations began to circulate", also drawing comparisons to the Bellamy salute. Pulitzer Center fellow Alec Luhn said: "Slavic neo-Nazis do a similar salute, to the point that the phrase 'from the heart to the sun' often serves as a stand-in for actually doing the salute."

The Anti-Defamation League (ADL) came to Musk's defense, stating in an X post: "It seems that Elon Musk made an awkward gesture in a moment of enthusiasm, not a Nazi salute", adding: "In this moment, all sides should give one another a bit of grace, perhaps even the benefit of the doubt, and take a breath. This is a new beginning." However, former ADL national director Abraham Foxman described the gesture as a "Heil Hitler Nazi salute". The Jewish Telegraphic Agency (JTA) said that the ADL appeared to be contradicting its own definition of a Nazi salute, which the ADL defines as "raising an outstretched right arm with the palm down". IfNotNow, a progressive Jewish group, said it was "appalled" that the ADL had "glossed over Musk's Nazi gesture, admonishing those of us who were aghast at the Hitler salute to give Musk 'the benefit of the doubt' — even as the ADL assumes the worst intentions of those in the movement for Palestinian human rights". Aaron Astor, a history professor at Tennessee's Maryville College, defended the ADL's stance on X, stating that it was "not a Nazi salute". Ruth Ben-Ghiat, professor of history and fascism at New York University, said that it was "a Nazi salute – and a very belligerent one too". The ADL declined to say how it had reached this conclusion when asked by the JTA. ADL CEO Jonathan Greenblatt later expressed regret that he had not "framed" the tweet differently given "the impact that it had".

The Southern Poverty Law Center, a nonprofit organization specializing in civil rights, referred to it as an "apparent Nazi salute" and noted that several far-right figures had celebrated it as a Roman salute. Several academics with expertise on extremism have agreed to describing the gesture as a Nazi salute. The Lemkin Institute for Genocide Prevention responded to the "Nazi salute" by issuing a red flag alert for genocide in the United States.

Jerry Nadler, a Jewish Democratic congressman from Manhattan, called the gesture antisemitic. Alexandria Ocasio-Cortez, a progressive Democratic congresswoman, condemned the gesture, saying that she was "not rocking with anyone sympathetic to Nazis". Minnesota governor and vice presidential candidate Tim Walz said that Musk's gesture was "of course" a Nazi salute. Musk said on Twitter that he would consider suing Walz for this statement. Texas senator Ted Cruz defended Musk, saying that he "literally said 'my heart goes out to you' as he made the gesture from his heart to the people". After PBS News Hour described Musk as making "what appeared to be a fascist salute", Republican congresswoman Marjorie Taylor Greene accused it of "lying and spreading propaganda to serve the Democrat party". Israeli professor at Columbia University and pro-Israel activist Shai Davidai stated: "I don't care who you are, doing a Nazi salute is never ok." Republican representative Elise Stefanik, Trump's nominee to serve as ambassador to the United Nations, defended Musk at her confirmation hearing. On the late-night sketch comedy show Saturday Night Live, cast members James Austin Johnson (as Trump) and Michael Che lampooned the moment in the show's cold open and Weekend Update segment. During a CNN NewsNight discussion, Scott Jennings, conservative political strategist and former Bush staffer, said critics who accused Musk of doing a Nazi salute were "suffering from progression of Trump derangement syndrome", and told them to "lawyer up". Catherine Rampell challenged him to repeat the gesture on air, which he did not.

A YouGov survey of US citizens found that, after watching a video of the salute, 42% said that it was a Nazi salute or a Roman salute (37% and 5%, respectively) and 42% said that it was a "gesture from the heart". Of those who said it was a Nazi salute, 49% said it was on purpose, to indicate support for Nazi views, and 30% said it was done as a joke or to provoke controversy. 4% said it was an accident and 15% were not sure. 73% of Harris voters said that it was a Nazi or Roman salute, and 16% a gesture from the heart, while 79% of Trump voters said it was a gesture from the heart, and 11% a Nazi or Roman salute.

=== Jewish groups and Holocaust survivors ===
The Simon Wiesenthal Center said that Musk's actions raised "serious concerns", and that his "unexpected double salute, which resembled gestures associated with troubling historical connotations, is challenging to understand". It called on him to "clarify or apologize" for the gesture. The Jewish Council for Public Affairs released a statement saying: "Elon Musk knows precisely what he was doing with his fascist Roman salute at today's Trump rally – which follows his explicit embrace of far-right parties and policies." The Jerusalem Post said that many Jewish groups accused Musk of performing an "unambiguous" Nazi salute.

Amy Spitalnick, CEO of the Jewish Council for Public Affairs, said that Musk's salute was neither ambiguous nor just a distraction, but would be taken by extremists "as license for their own violent extremism", and was part of a pattern in Musk's behavior, including his support for the German far-right party Alternative für Deutschland and the increase in extremism he has allowed on Twitter, which she said contributed to normalizing antisemitic and extremist views. She gave the example of Musk's endorsement of a Twitter post in November 2023 that claimed that Jewish people promote "hatred against whites" and support immigration by "hordes of minorities", which Musk commented was "the actual truth". He later apologized and called it his "worst and dumbest" post. Spitalnick questioned this apology, and said that Musk's "embrace of antisemitism and extremism" will make Jews and other communities less safe.

Michel Friedman, German former Christian Democrat politician and former deputy chair of the Central Council of Jews in Germany, described Musk's gestures as a "disgrace" that showed that "the breaking of taboos is reaching a dangerous point for the entire free world". Masha Pearl, executive director of Holocaust survivor charity The Blue Card, said that it was a Nazi salute, and called it "an unmistakable symbol of hate, of violence, of genocide". In Canada, Holocaust survivor David Moskovic stated he was alarmed by Musk's salute. A coalition of Jewish organizations in the US and Canada announced that they would be leaving X in response to the incident. Some asset managers have received pressure from Jewish investors to sell Tesla stock in response.

166 Jewish leaders, including rabbis and activists, signed an open letter condemning Musk's "Nazi salute", saying: "Almost daily, he spreads heinous conspiracy theories like the Great Replacement conspiracy theory, promotes neo-Nazis, and agrees with tweets claiming Jews push hate against white people." They stated: "When the world's richest man combines political power with a platform that can mobilize hate, the danger becomes immediate and lethal", and reiterated their earlier call for a boycott of X.

=== Germany ===
Musk's salute was described, by a range of German newspapers, as "reminiscent of", "similar to", and "at least very similar to" a Nazi salute, as an "alleged Nazi salute", as a "Nazi salute gesture", and simply as a "Nazi salute". (Note: In German, the Nazi salute is referred to as Hitlergruß ('Hitler salute').) Stefanie Stork wrote in the Frankfurter Allgemeine Zeitung: "It is not possible that Musk was unaware of the symbolism he was using when he made the gesture of an arm stretched upwards in salute." In an interview with Der Spiegel, Kira Ayyadi of the anti-extremism Amadeu Antonio Foundation said: "That was definitely a Nazi salute." Anna Schneider in Die Welt was skeptical, writing: "The mob needs its material, and the material is called Nazi." Lenz Jacobsen wrote in Die Zeit: "Someone who, on a political stage during a political speech in front of a partly far-right audience swings their right arm upwards diagonally multiple times, is giving the Nazi salute. There's no need for 'alleged' or 'similar' or 'disputed'." Timo Feldhaus wrote in the Berliner Zeitung: "That Elon Musk carefully considered his energetically performed signal, is safe to assume. Even a man as oblivious to history as he is knows what he's doing in this situation." Andreas Biller wrote in Focus magazine that Musk's gesture "was recognised by most observers as clearly a Nazi salute". In Stern magazine, Félice Gritti wrote that the "dirty trick" was not the accusations, as Musk had said, but the "ambiguity" of the gesture, and compared this to how far-right AfD politician and former history teacher Björn Höcke was twice convicted of using the banned Nazi slogan "Alles für Deutschland", despite having claimed not to know that it was the slogan of the Sturmabteilung Nazi paramilitary. The New York Times said that "there was little doubt about its meaning" in Germany, and noted that making a Nazi salute is illegal there, along with the use of other extremist symbols and slogans. Public broadcaster Rundfunk Berlin-Brandenburg said that Musk's gesture "is in principle a punishable offence in Germany".

When asked about the incident, German Chancellor Olaf Scholz stated that Europe will not accept support for extreme-right positions. Musk reacted to the remarks on X by mocking Scholz. The German party Die Linke called for Musk to be banned from entering Germany, citing both the gestures and Musk's past support for Germany's far-right AfD party and his continued interference in European politics. Austria's Green Party also called for a similar ban. Austrian green politician Lukas Hammer called both Interior and Foreign Ministries to consider the possibility of denying Musk's entry. British anti-Brexit activist group Led By Donkeys projected an image of Musk's gesture onto the Tesla Gigafactory in the city of Berlin with the phrase "Heil Tesla", accompanied by social media posts which criticized Musk's political views. Later, the German law enforcement launched an investigation into the image projected by the group, stating that it may have breached German laws on the use of symbols linked to illegal organizations.

On the same day as his salutes, January 20, 2025, ahead of International Holocaust Remembrance Day, Musk addressed attendees at an AfD rally by videolink, where he stated that there is "too much focus on past guilt", suggesting that children should not be held accountable for their ancestors' actions and warned against the 'dilution' of the German people resulting from multiculturalism. According to The New York Times, Musk's comments were "an apparent effort to wipe away the long shadow of the Nazis that has influenced generations of Germans to quarantine extreme political parties from public life". Danny Dayan, chair of Holocaust memorial Yad Vashem, said: "Contrary to Musk's advice, the remembrance and acknowledgement of the dark past of the country and its people should be central in shaping the German society. Failing to do so is an insult to the victims of Nazism and a clear danger to the democratic future of Germany."

=== International ===
Comic by Brazilian cartoonist Carlos Latuff, criticizing a perceived double standard in the ADL's response to the salute vs. pro-Palestine activism

Benjamin Netanyahu, the prime minister of Israel, defended Musk on X, stating that Musk "is being falsely smeared" and calling him "a great friend of Israel". Following Musk's speech, Andrea Stroppa, Musk's representative in Italy, posted the image of him on X along with the caption: "Roman Empire is back, starting with the Roman salute." Later, he removed the post, stating that Musk "is autistic" and that he was just expressing his feelings without emulating fascism. An Italian communist youth organization, Cambiare Rotta, hung a doll of Musk upside down in Piazzale Loreto, a square in Milan where Mussolini's body was hung in the same manner by partisans after he was executed during the final days of World War II. Italian journalist Roberto Saviano attacked Elon Musk in a Facebook post, stating: "The end of all this will be violent. His fall will be equal to that of those to whom it historically refers with this gesture. Musk will fall at the hands of those he now incites fueled by the same violence he practices."

Argentina's President Javier Milei defended Musk at the World Economic Forum's meeting in the city of Davos; Milei stated that his "dear friend Musk" has been "unfairly vilified by 'wokeism' in recent hours for an innocent gesture that only means his gratitude to the people". Yolanda Díaz, the Spanish minister of labor and longtime member of the Communist Party of Spain, announced that she would quit using X in response to the gesture. She also accused Musk of turning X into a "propaganda mechanism". In a radio interview in March, Reform UK leader Nigel Farage said that he did not "for a moment" think that Musk's gestures were Nazi salutes, and when asked what they were, said, "very unwise", adding: "They're not really Nazi salutes, because they're out to the side and not in front." He said that he did not think that Elon Musk is a Nazi.

=== Far-right ===
Numerous neo-Nazi and white nationalist figures expressed support for Musk's gestures. Thomas Sewell, an Australian neo-Nazi, posted a video of Musk's gestures, describing it as a "Donald Trump White Power moment". Nick Fuentes, founder of the white nationalist group Groypers, described the gesture as "straight up like 'Sieg Heil', like loving Hitler energy". Social media influencer Andrew Tate responded to Musk's salute by saying, "we're so back". The admin of a Telegram channel run by the white supremacist Active Club Network (whose members have been recorded making Nazi salutes) said: "They follow us. Our ideas are on top. Musk knows it. We know it. Everybody wanna be us. Even the world's richest guy", before adding: "But he is still what he is. A nerd." Mark Collett, a neo-Nazi and leader of far-right hate group Patriotic Alternative, said that Trump and Musk have "certainly helped to up the rhetoric and help to normalise certain things", and "if we can get anything out of it – we should." Christopher Pohlhaus, leader of the neo-Nazi group Blood Tribe, posted on Telegram: "I don't care if this was a mistake. I'm going to enjoy the tears over it." Andrew Torba, founder of the far-right social media platform Gab, said: "Incredible things are happening already lmao." A Proud Boys chapter posted a clip of Musk's video to its Telegram channel with the text "Hail Trump!" White supremacist movement White Lives Matter also reacted to Musk's gestures on Telegram with the message: "Thanks for (sometimes) hearing us, Elon. The White Flame will rise again!"

Two weeks after the incident, rapper Kanye West posted several antisemitic and pro-Nazi comments on Twitter, among which was an uploaded image of Musk's gesture captioned "heil Elon" in all capitals. West said: "Elon stole my Nazi swag at the inauguration."

=== Others ===
Many users on X, the social media platform which Musk owns, criticized the gesture, saying it resembled a Nazi salute. Some of Musk's supporters on Twitter said that it was a Roman salute. In response to Musk's gestures, many major subreddits on Reddit instituted new rules banning links to X or screenshots of X posts. Sam Kuffel, a meteorologist at CBS 58 in Milwaukee, left the station after she criticized the gesture in two Instagram posts. Musk's estranged daughter Vivian Wilson spoke out about Musk's gesture, stating: "I'm just gonna say let's call a spade a fucking spade" on Instagram's Threads platform on January 21. Elon Musk's father, Errol, defended Musk, calling the accusations against Elon "absolute nonsense" and "rubbish".

== Musk's reaction to criticism ==
Elon Musk responded to criticism of his alleged salute on January 21 via X, including calling all news outlets criticizing him biased. He wrote that "The legacy media is pure propaganda", that "they need better dirty tricks", and that "the 'everyone is Hitler' attack is sooo tired".

After it was written on the Wikipedia entry on Musk that his gestures had been "compared to a Nazi salute", he reiterated his previous criticism against the website, calling for its "defunding". Wikipedia founder Jimmy Wales challenged him to find an inaccuracy in its description of events, saying: "That isn't MSM propaganda. That's fact. Every element of it."

On January 23, three days after the incident, Musk made a series of Nazi-themed puns on social media as a reaction to the controversy, and the Anti-Defamation League (after previously defending his behavior) called the puns "offensive" and "inappropriate". The U.S. newspaper The Hill said he used the puns "to taunt those who accused him of making a fascist salute". On the following day, Musk wrote that the notion he gave a Nazi salute was a deception:

It was astonishing how insanely hard legacy media tried to cancel me for saying "my heart goes out to you" and moving my hand from my heart to the audience. In the end, this deception will just be another nail in the coffin of legacy media.

In a discussion with Joe Rogan on his podcast, published on February 28, Musk said: "Hopefully, people realize I am not a Nazi", adding: "The war and genocide is the bad part, not their mannerisms and their dress code."

== Copycat incidents ==
British political commentator Calvin Robinson gave a speech at the National Pro-Life Summit in Washington, D.C., which concluded with him stating "My heart goes out to you" and performing a gesture that was described as a "pro-Nazi salute" in a statement released the same day by the Anglican Catholic Church. The alleged Nazi salute was seen as an imitation of Musk's actions by commentators. The church announced that Robinson's license in his church had been revoked and was no longer a priest of the ACC, and the entire editorial team at his gaming news website, God is a Geek, resigned in protest. The Anglican Catholic Church said: "We believe that those who mimic the Nazi salute, even as a joke or an attempt to troll their opponents, trivialize the horror of the Holocaust and diminish the sacrifice of those who fought against its perpetrators. Such actions are harmful, divisive, and contrary to the tenets of Christian charity."

Laura Smith, the Towamencin Township supervisor in Pennsylvania, resigned after posting a TikTok video of her appearing to replicate Musk's gesture. She later deleted the video.

A real estate agent in San Antonio made a social media video in which she imitated Musk's salute and said: "My heart goes out to you." Her employer, RD Realty Group, subsequently dismissed her and referred to her as having made "an offensive gesture".

The CEO of an Idaho construction company apologized and later resigned after performing the salute during a skit at a company event. He said his performance of the salute was an "attempt at humor and parody" meant to "mimic Donald Trump and Elon Musk", and that he "reject[ed] any association with hate groups".

Steve Bannon, who previously served as Chief Strategist and Senior Counselor to Donald Trump in 2017, appeared to replicate Musk's salute during a speech at the 2025 Conservative Political Action Conference (CPAC), drawing applause from the audience. Unlike Musk, Bannon did not place his hand to his heart or state "My heart goes out to you". French National Rally politician Jordan Bardella canceled his planned speech at the conference, and called Bannon's action a "gesture alluding to Nazi ideology".

Since January 30, there have been five incidents of antisemitism and Nazi salutes at French universities, by students associated with the right-wing UNI student union. According to Johann Chapoutot, a historian specializing in Nazism, Elon Musk's salutes have acted to legitimize Nazi salutes.

== Decontextualization ==
The image of Musk making this gesture is sometimes presented out of its original context, omitting the words he was speaking at the time he made the gesture, and instead his gesture is inserted into the "constellation of emblematic neo-Nazi body movements". Thus, it has been argued, "the real crime is decontextualization".

In the years preceding this Musk controversy, U.S. politicians often made gestures that could be superficially characterized as Nazi salutes, but viewed in context were clearly not. According to the fact-checkers at Snopes, many of the accusations about Musk's gesture "were based on appearances alone and ignored the context of Musk's words”, and “available evidence is too scant to draw a solid conclusion” about the gesture together with its context.

== See also ==
- Political activities of Elon Musk
- Views of Elon Musk § Race and white nationalism
- Tesla Takedown
