= ESIB =

ESIB may refer to:

- Estonian Safety Investigation Bureau
- European Student Information Bureau, now the European Students' Union
- École supérieure internationale de Bruxelles
