= Estonian Maritime Administration =

Government agency of Estonia

- Estonian: Veeteede Amet
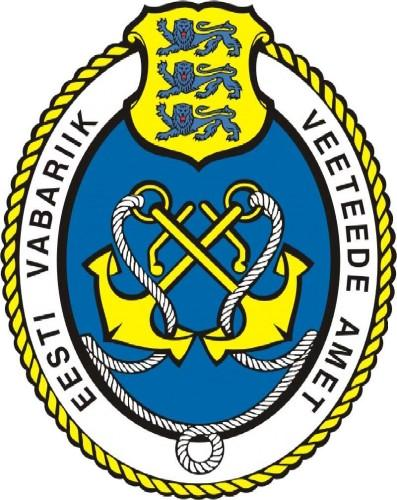
- Seal of the Estonian Maritime Administration

Agency overview
- Formed: 16 January 1990
- Dissolved: 1 January 2021
- Superseding agency: Estonian Transport Administration
- Jurisdiction: Government of Estonia
- Parent agency: Ministry of Economic Affairs and Communications

The Estonian Maritime Administration (Estonian: Veeteede Amet) was a governmental agency that operated within the area of government of the Ministry of Economic Affairs and Communications. It was mainly tasked with implementing national economic policies and maritime safety in Estonian territorial and navigable inland waters. In 2021, the organization was superseded by the Estonian Transport Administration.

== History ==
=== 1918 - 1940 ===
On 13 November 1918, after the departure of German occupation forces, the Estonian Provisional Government took over the Maritime Safety and Navigational Auxiliary Service and then formed the agency as part of the Command of Tallinn Port. A month later, the Command of Tallinn Port became the Ports Authority. On February 1, 1919, two new agencies were formed in addition to the Ports Authority - the Pilots, Lighthouses and Aids to Navigation Authority office and the Board of Waterways, Ports’ Dredging and Repair office. On March 1, 1920, the previously established agencies were united into a new agency - the General Authority of Maritime Issues - which was subordinate to the Ministry of Trade and Industry. On 22 May 1922, the General Authority of Maritime Issues was subordinated to the Ministry of Roads. On July 1, 1929, the agency was reformed into the Waterways Authority, which was tasked with organizing ship traffic at Estonian seas and inland waterways, preparing new development projects for ports and maintenance plans for waterways, and technical inspection and management of Estonian merchant fleet. The Waterways Authority was renamed the Waterways Department on 8 April 1938. On 31 December 1940, after the Soviets had annexed Estonia, the agency was dissolved and its resources were transferred to the Estonian Shipping Company and Hydrography Service of the Soviet Union Navy.

=== 1990 - present ===
The decision to establish the Estonian Maritime Administration was made on December 1, 1989, and the agency was formed on 16 January 1990. The first statute of the Estonian Maritime Administration was approved on 29 April 1990, and the agency was tasked with preparing the Merchant Shipping Code, which was accepted on December 9, 1990. At the same time, the creation of the Estonian Ship Register began, which was approved on November 8, 1991. On 3 August 1993, an agreement was signed between Estonia and Russia for the transfer of hydrographic resources to Estonia, and on October 1, Estonia took over the responsibility of ensuring safe shipping in its waters. To fulfil its obligations, the icebreaker Tarmo was purchased in 1993. In the beginning, the main tasks of the organization included icebreaking, offering piloting services and fulfilling coast guard duties, like maritime rescue and oil pollution control. Between 1995 and 1996, those duties were transferred to other institutions. However, icebreaking duties were transferred back in 2000. On January 31, 1992, the Estonian Maritime Administration joined the International Maritime Organization. In January 1994, it joined the International Association of Lighthouse Authorities; in February 1997, the International Hydrographic Organization; and in March 2001, the World Association for Waterborne Transport Infrastructure. On July 1, 2005, Estonia became a signatory of the Paris Memorandum of Understanding on Port State Control. The Estonian Maritime Administration was merged into the Transport Administration on 1 January 2021.

=== Pictures ===
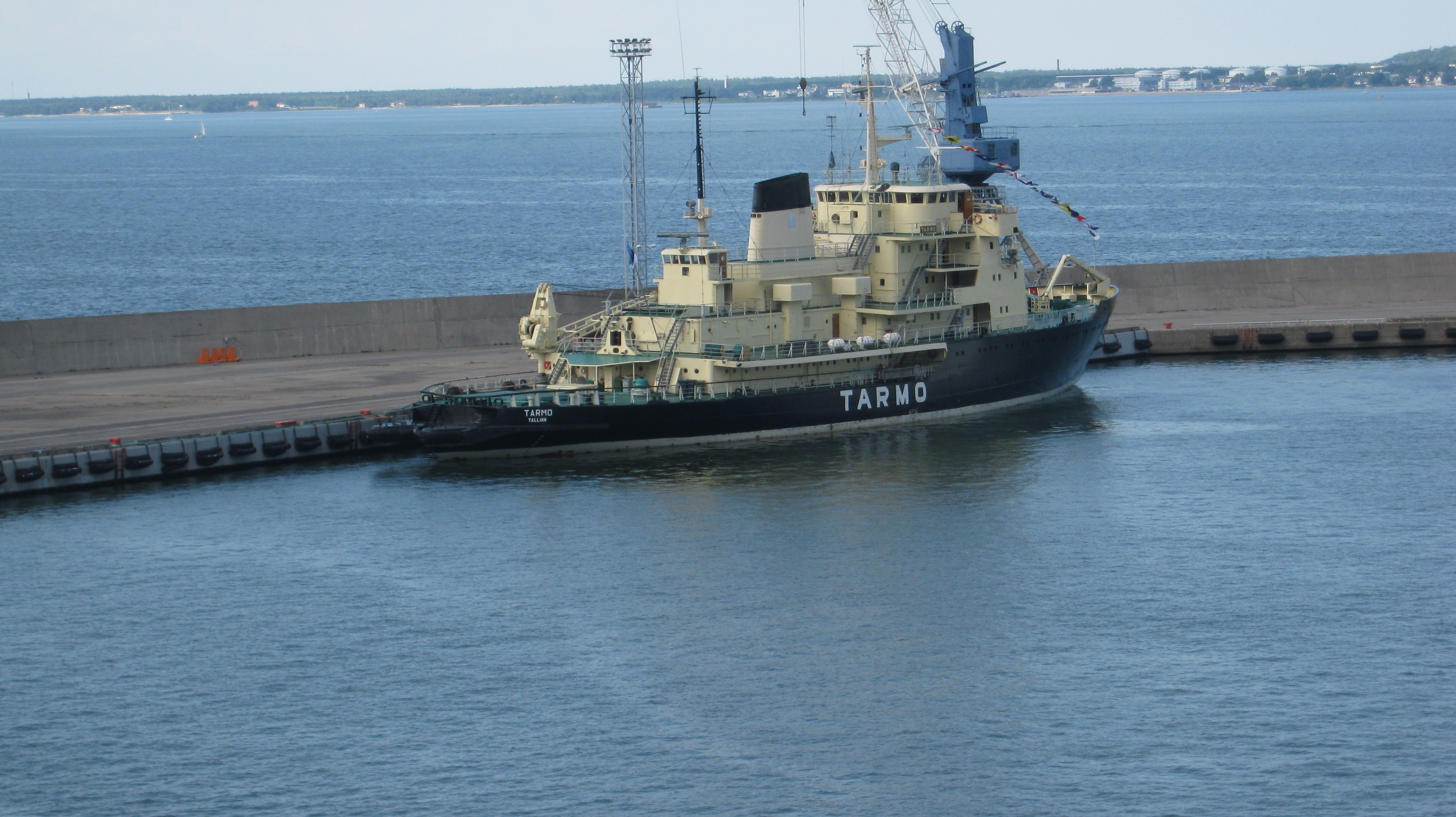
Icebreaker Tarmo

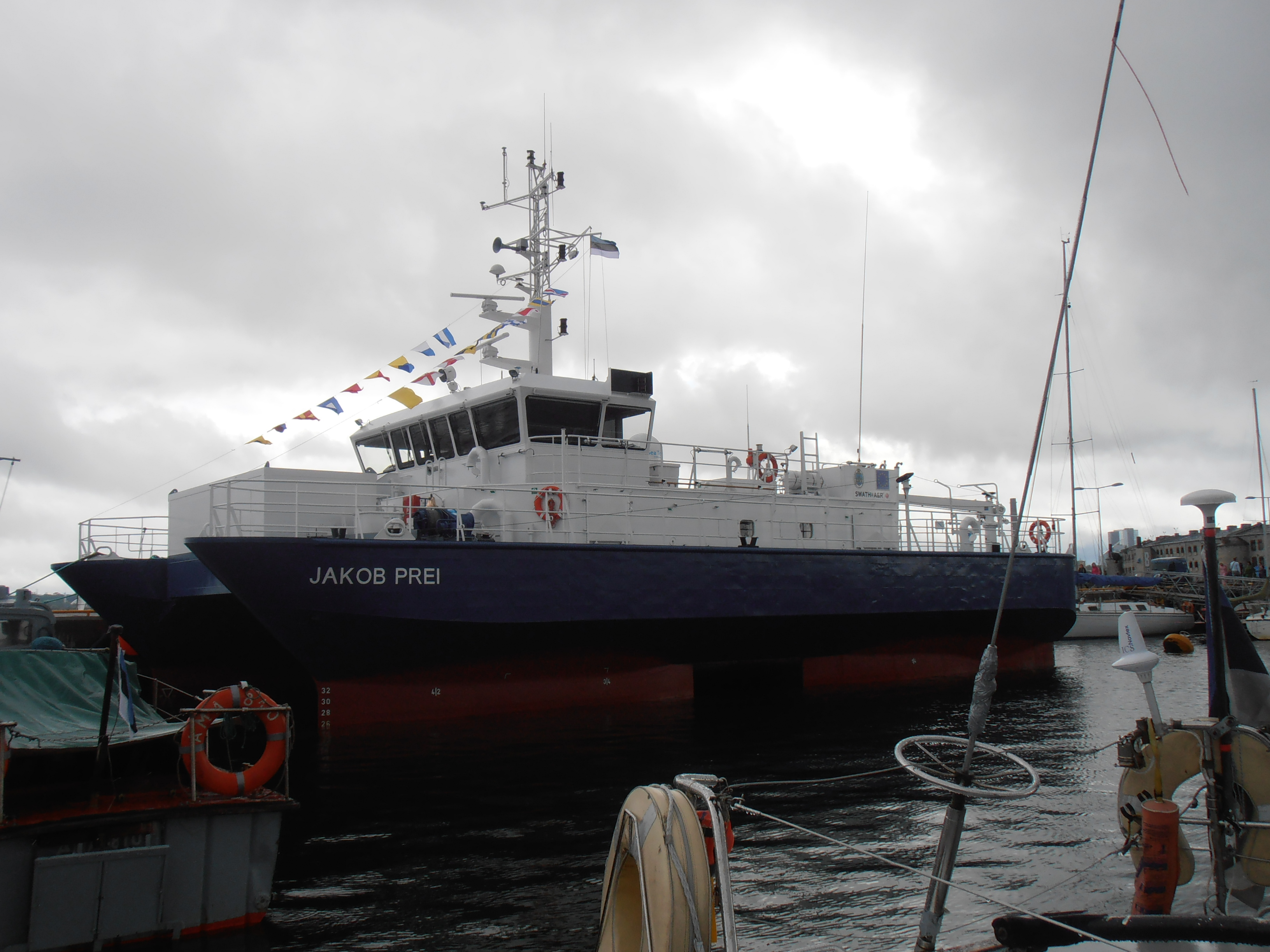
Hydrographic research vessel Jakob Prei

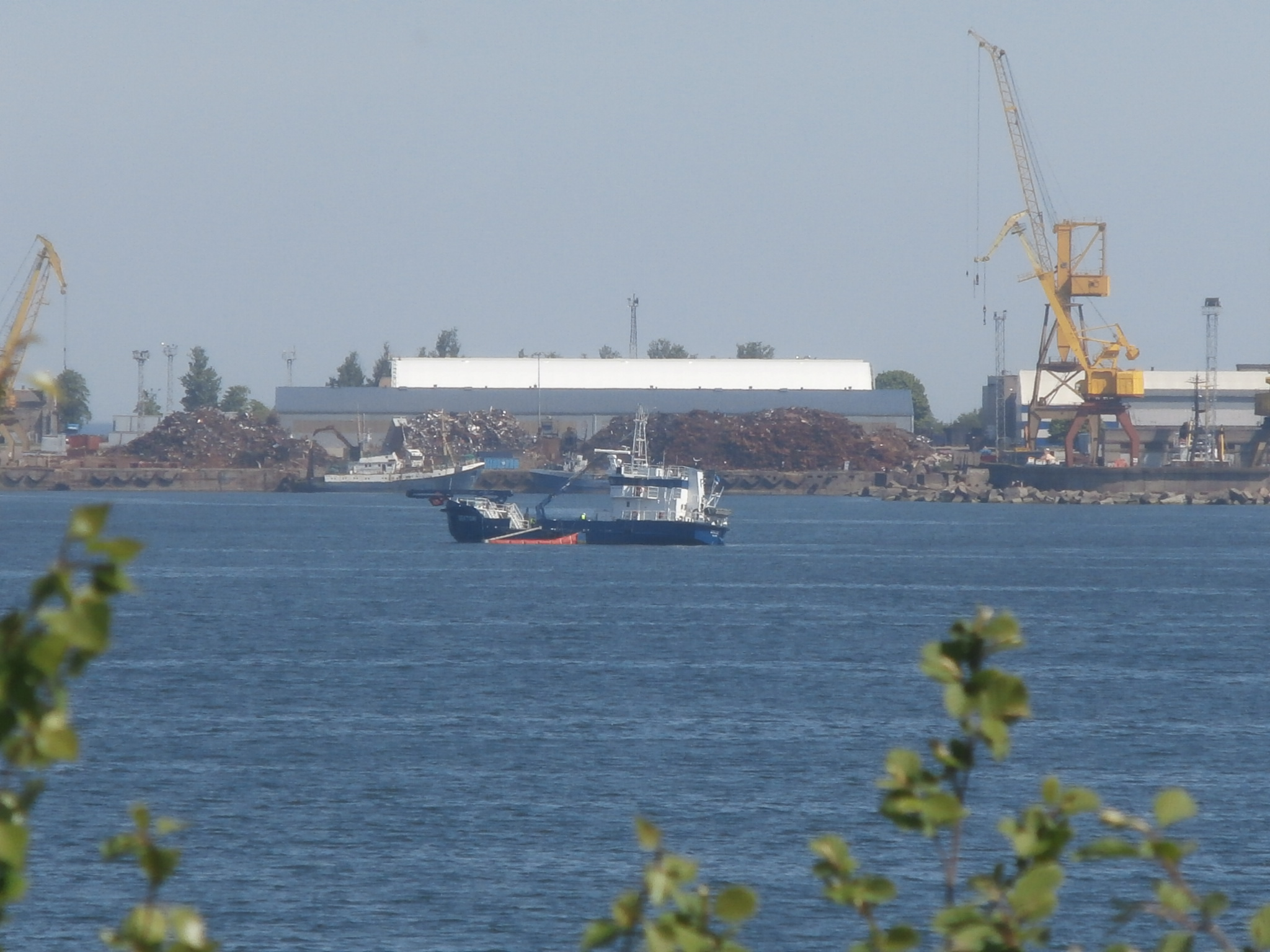
Sektori clearing oil pollution

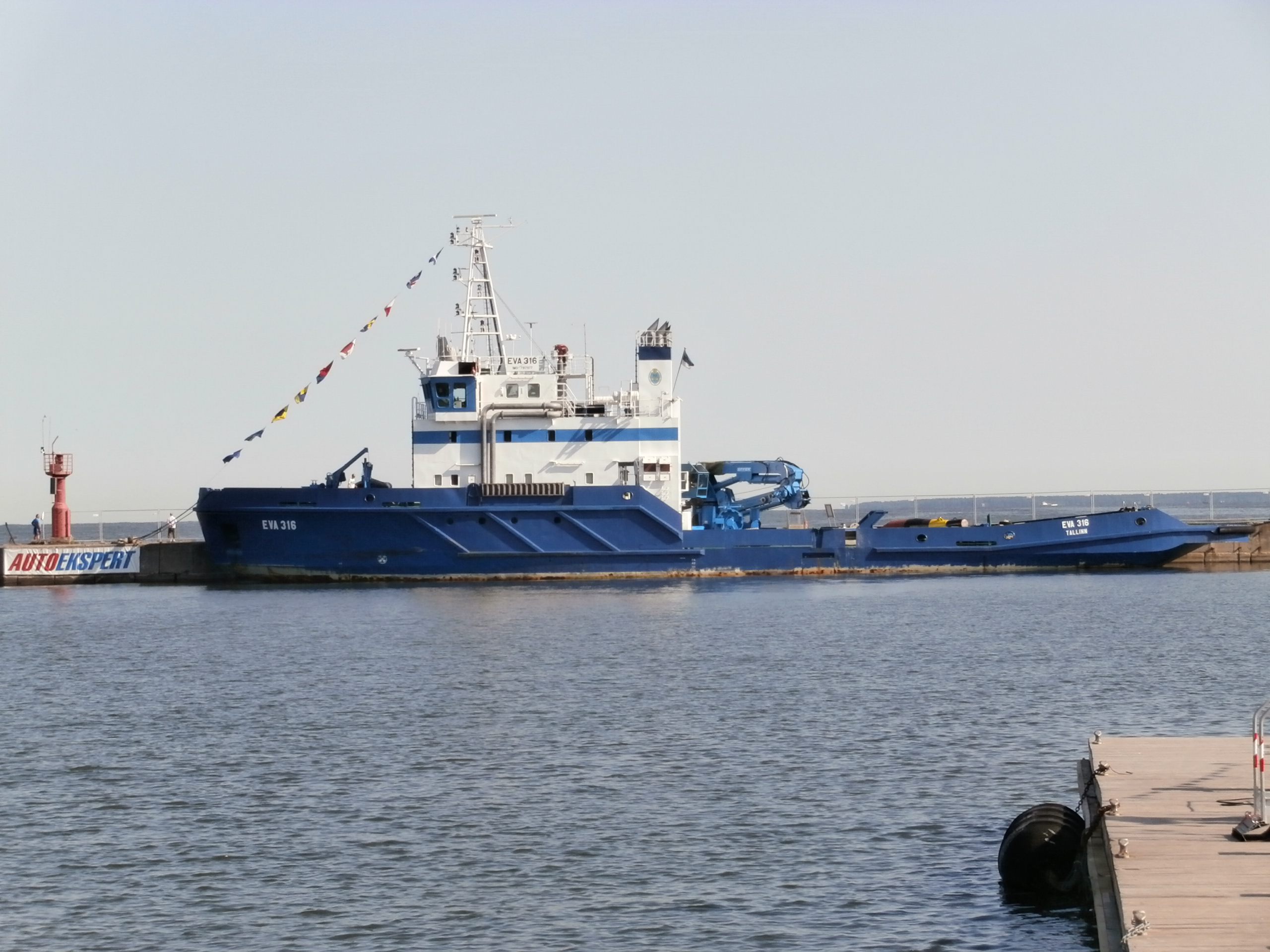
multipurpose vessel EVA–316

== See also ==
- Estonian Safety Investigation Bureau
- Estonian Civil Aviation Administration
