= OJK =

OJK may refer to:

- Estonian Safety Investigation Bureau (Estonian: Ohutusjuurdluse Keskus)
- Financial Services Authority (Indonesia) (Indonesian: Otoritas Jasa Keuangan)
