= Full Self-Driving =

Full self-driving most commonly refers to:

- Self-driving car, a classification of autonomous technology relating to automotive vehicles
- Tesla Autopilot with Full Self-Driving (FSD) capabilities, developed by Tesla, Inc.
