= Estonian Civil Aviation Administration =

Government agency of Estonia

- Lennuamet

Agency overview
- Formed: 16 January 1990
- Dissolved: 1 January 2021
- Superseding agency: Estonian Transport Administration
- Jurisdiction: Ministry of Economic Affairs and Communications
- Headquarters: Lõõtsa 5 (Ülemiste City), Tallinn; 59.421251°N 24.802797°E

The Estonian Civil Aviation Administration (Estonian: Lennuamet) was the civil aviation authority of Estonia, working in the jurisdiction of Ministry of Economic Affairs and Communications and exercising civil aviation state inspection and supervising over the implementation of national laws and regulations. The Estonian Civil Aviation Administration was merged into the Transport Administration on 1 January 2021.

The Civil Aviation Authority had the highest competence in the organization and supervision of aviation safety in Estonia, it was an internationally recognized organization. The Agency dealt with the regulation of civil aviation safety, issued aviation permits, maintained aircraft registers, issued maintenance organization certificates, aircraft airworthiness and flight simulator equipment qualification certificates, organized radio communication (aviation radio conversations) qualification exams, line pilot, commercial pilot and instrument flight competency theory exams, etc.

== See also ==
- Estonian Safety Investigation Bureau
