= École supérieure internationale de Bruxelles =

The École Supérieure Internationale de Bruxelles (ÉSIB), is a private European institution of higher education, and an educational branch of the Fundación Dharma. It was constituted by Royal Decree 6/CH/15.372, published in the Moniteur Belge 13/09/06. ÉSIB offers educational courses leading to Certificates, Diplomas and Degrees up to Doctorate levels like a university affiliated with the University of Panama International University-Universidad Internacional Euroamericana (UIE).

ÉSIB is part of the educational project of the Spanish organization Fundación Dharma, accredited under the Ministry of Education and Social Politics registration number 03-0070, Ministerial decree of December 30, 2002, and a member of the Spanish Agency of International Cooperation of the Foreign Office and Cooperation, registered center of Social Services in the Department of Welfare, Regional Government (Generalitat Valenciana).

Fundación Dharma is a member of the Consejo Iberoamericano that has received the International prize for Educational Excellence and the French Humanitarian Work Gold Medal, International Prize of Human Rights. The Fundación Dharma along with their international subsidiary, Dharma College University Foundation, manages and directs the programs of the ESIB and the UIE. These three institutions are the educational division of the Foundation. International University - International University Euroamericana is an institution online and onsite private higher education in Panama, founded on 27 March 2000 and accredited and approved officially in the Republic of Panama through Executive Decree No. 225 of 29 May 2003, signed by the President of the Republic and the Minister of Education and its qualifications are recognized by the Panamanian State and all States signatories to the Convenio Andres Bello (23 countries in Latin), including: Argentina, Bolivia, Brazil, Colombia, Costa Rica, Chile, Ecuador, El Salvador, Guatemala, Haiti, Honduras, Mexico, Nicaragua, Panama, Paraguay, Peru, Puerto Rico, Dominican Republic, Uruguay, Venezuela, and the United States and Spain as observers. Moreover, being a university officially created and overseen by the Panamanian State Titles are also recognized by the International Business by UNESCO and the governments and the best universities in America, Europe and Asia. Institutions of the Fundación Dharma International Education Network are Accredited by the Organization of American States in a letter signed by the Chairman of the Permanent Council Fundación Dharma an educational institution with headquarters in Spain, is an associate of the Cátedra UNESCO Education for Peace and International Comprehension, an educational initiative of the Latin American Council, and member of the European Association for International Education EAIE.

The Fundación Dharma is integrated in India with FFLV working in 11 countries, and supports a center of 1200 students, with a new university upper school in India. The Fundación Dharma seeks to develop the first free online university for students with scarce economic resources.

The ÉSIB’ headquarters for Europe and installations are located in Monòver, Spain. University courses and vocational training for the financially less fortunate are offered.

ÉSIB and UIE, as educational projects of the Fundación Dharma, seek funds to financially assist students and scholars of India, Spain, Panama and other countries of Spanish America. Scholarships are offered to further educational advancement at universities in Spain, the Columbus University and other associated countries, and official representative for Spain of the Cátedra UNESCO.
