= Estonian Transport Administration =

Government agency of Estonia

- Transpordiamet
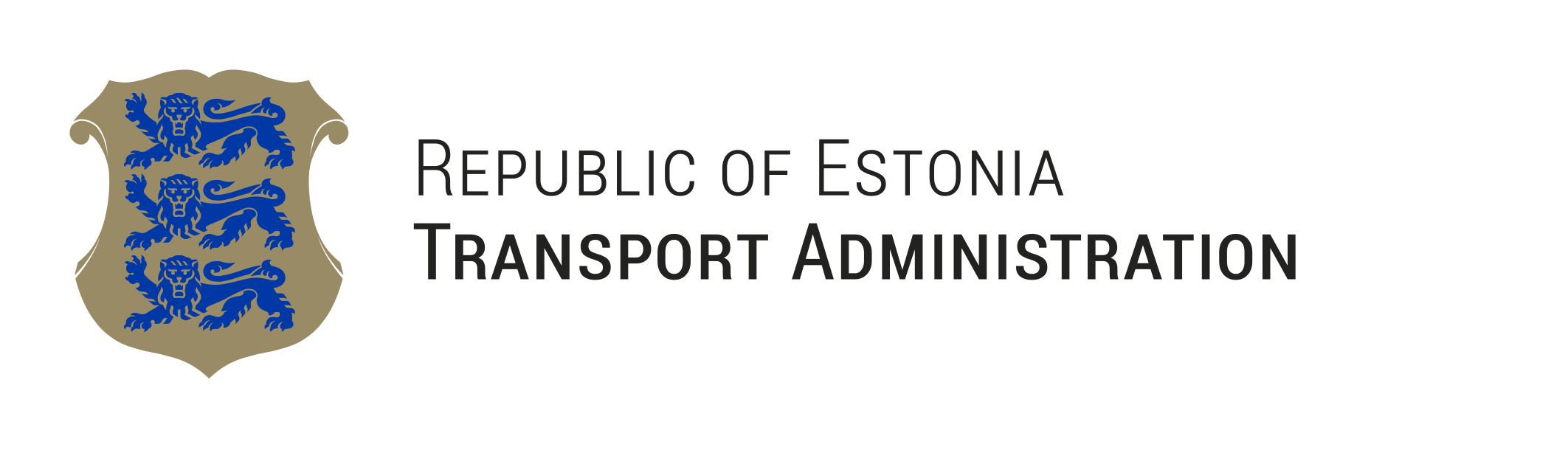

Agency overview
- Formed: 1 January 2021
- Preceding agencies: Estonian Maritime Administration; Estonian Civil Aviation Administration
- Jurisdiction: Government of Estonia
- Headquarters: Valge 4, 11413 Tallinn
- Agency executive: Kaido Padar
- Parent agency: Ministry of Economic Affairs and Communications
- Website: https://transpordiamet.ee/

Estonian Transport Administration is a governmental agency that operates within the area of government of the Ministry of Economic Affairs and Communications of Estonia. It is tasked with planning the mobility of people and water, air and land vehicles, and ensuring safe and environmentally sustainable infrastructure.

Kaido Padar was the Director General of the Transport Board until July 10, 2022. From July 11, 2022, the acting Director General is Ele Reiljan, Director of the Agency's Development Service.

== Structure ==
The Estonian Transport Administration's top leader is the Director General. Seven directors report to them. These directors each run a main division. One division, the Mobility Planning Division, handles future transport plans. The Infrastructure Management Division takes care of roads and bridges. The Mobility Management Division focuses on traffic flow. The Safety and Supervision Division works to keep transport safe. The Development Division explores new ideas and tech. The Public Relations Division handles communication with the public. The Support Services Division gives help to the other divisions. The Estonian Transport Administration also runs the Estonian Road Museum. The museum shows the history of roads in Estonia.

== Fleet ==
By superseding the Estonian Maritime Administration, the Estonian Transport Administration inherited its fleet, which includes the following vessels:

- Tarmo
- Jakob Prei
- Sektori
- Kaja
- Evatar
- EVA-023
- EVA-024
- EVA-026
- EVA-301
- EVA-302
- EVA-316
- EVA-318
- EVA-320
- EVA-324
- EVA-325
- EVA-326
- EVA-327
- EVA-328
