= Ministry of Economic Affairs and Communications =

Government ministry of Estonia

- Majandus- ja Kommunikatsiooniministeerium

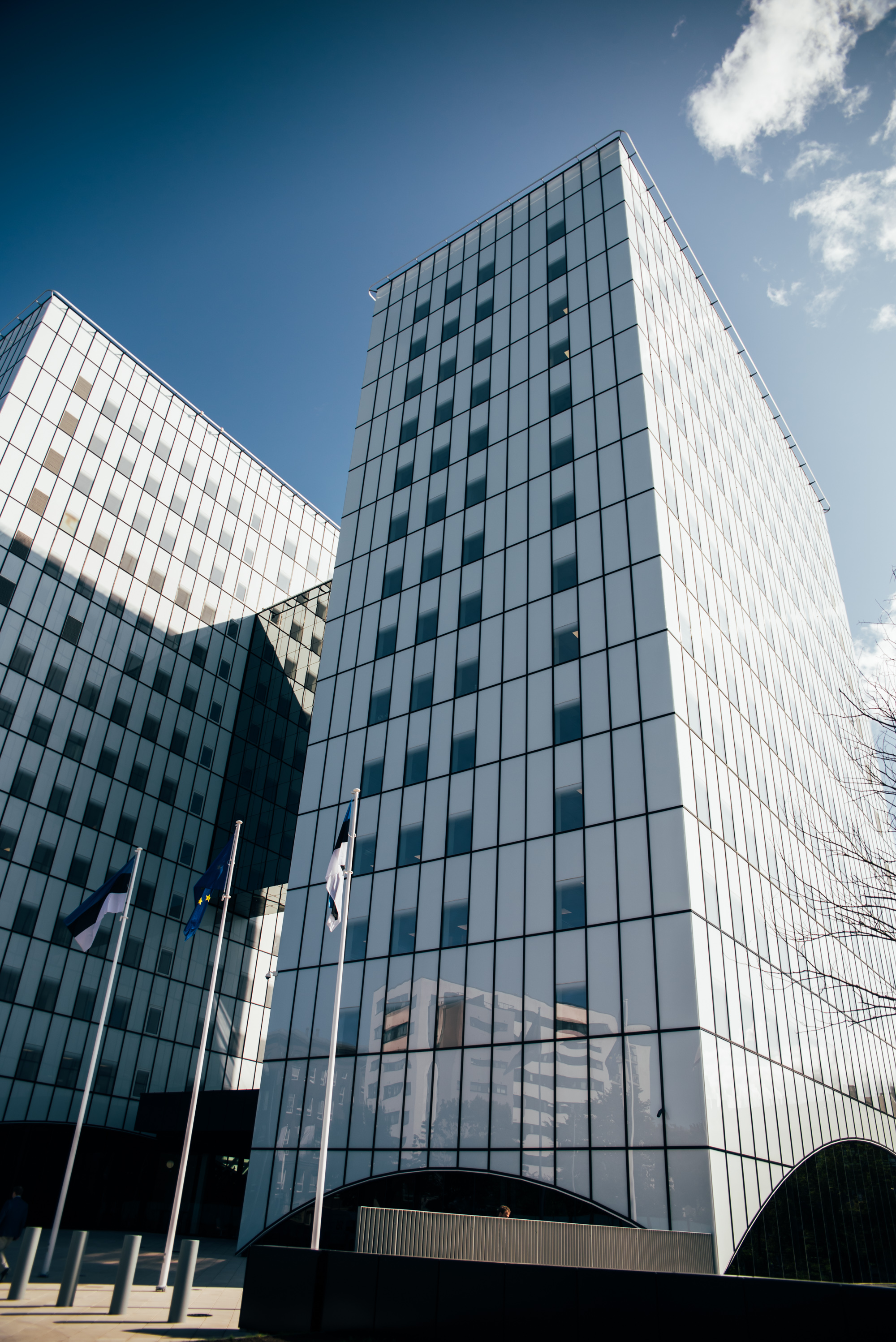

Agency overview
- Jurisdiction: Government of Estonia
- Headquarters: Suur-Ameerika 1, 10122 Tallinn, Estonia
- Annual budget: €1.45 billion (2023)
- Minister responsible: Erkki Keldo, Minister of Economy and Industry
- Child agencies: Estonian Transport Administration; Estonian Information System’s Authority (EISA); Consumer Protection and Technical Regulatory Authority; Estonian Safety Investigation Bureau
- Website: https://www.mkm.ee/en

The Ministry of Economic Affairs and Communications (Estonian: Majandus- ja Kommunikatsiooniministeerium) is a government ministry of Estonia. Its head office is in Tallinn.

== Purpose ==
The objectives of the Ministry of Economic Affairs and Communications is to create overall conditions for the growth of the competitiveness of the Estonian economy and its balanced and vital development through the drafting and implementing Estonian economic policy and evaluating its outcomes.

- The Ministry develops national development plans in the spheres within its area of government and will ensure their co-ordination with various transnational development plans, organises the funding, implementation and performance evaluation of such plans.
- The Ministry will participate, with other ministries, in the elaboration of development plans that focus on national economic development issues.
- Draft legal acts will be devised to organise the spheres within the Ministry's area of government, including the fulfilment of functions, assigned by these documents.
- Co-operation with the European Union and international organisation is organised within the Ministry's area of government.

The Ministry of Economic Affairs and Communications elaborates and implements the state's economic policy and economic development plans in the following fields:

- Construction and housing sector
- Post
- Energy sector
- Information society
- Economic development and entrepreneurship
- Transport sector
- Tourism sector
- Internal market of the European Union
- Foreign trade sector
