= Estonian Safety Investigation Bureau =

Estonian transport safety agency

Estonian Safety Investigation Bureau (ESIB; Estonian: Ohutusjuurdluse Keskus or OJK) is the transport safety agency of Estonia, headquartered in Tallinn. It is under the Ministry of Economic Affairs and Communications. It investigates aviation, maritime, and rail accidents.

It was established on 1 January 2012 by the merger of several accident investigation units.

Previously aviation accidents were investigated by the ministry's Aircraft Accident Investigation Commission (lennuõnnetuse põhjuste uurimiskomisjoni).

== See also ==
- Estonian Civil Aviation Administration
- Estonian Maritime Administration
