= Gigafactory New York =

Tesla, Inc. factory in Buffalo, New York

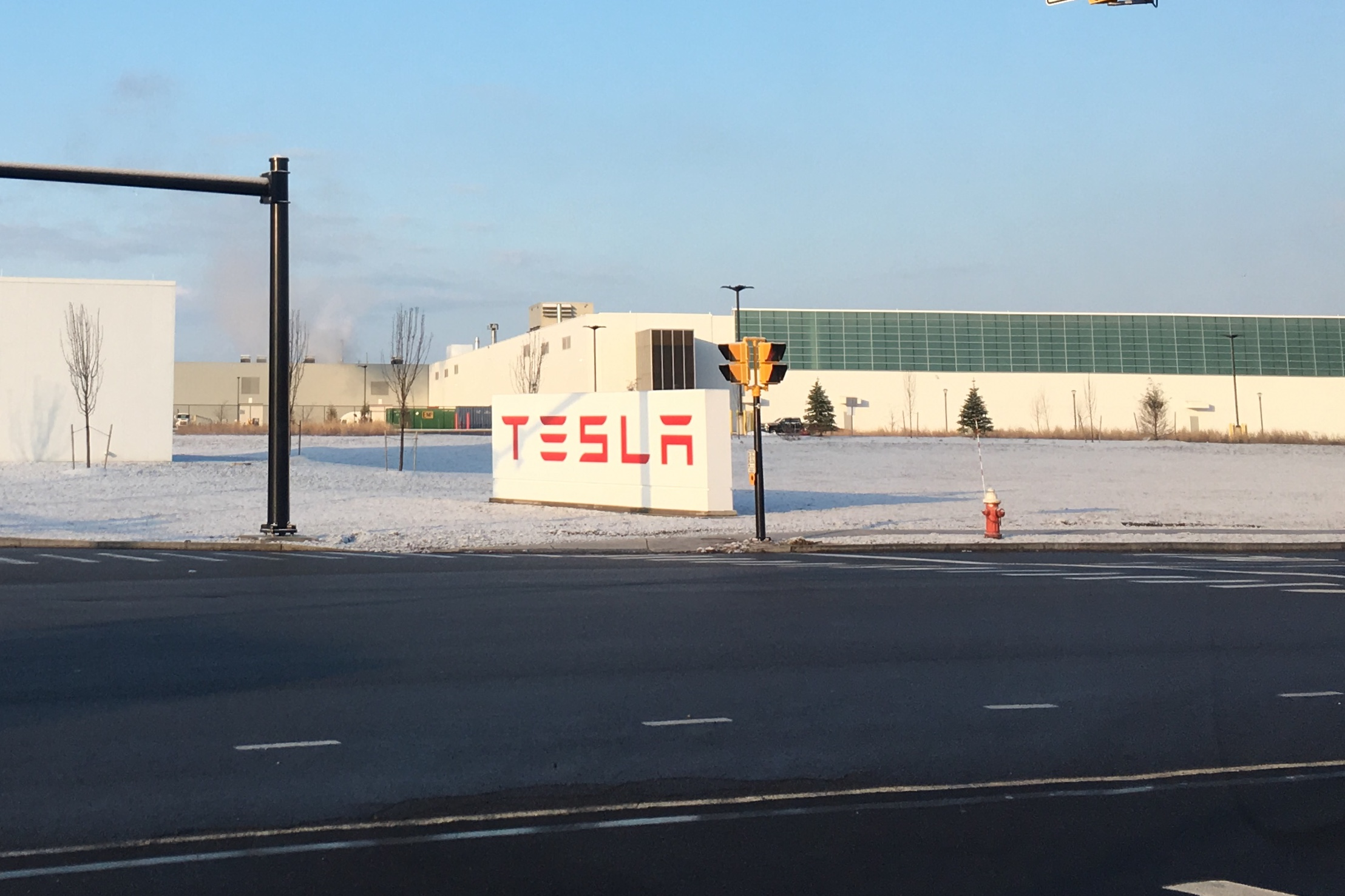
- Entrance to Gigafactory New York
- Built: 2014–2017
- Operated: August 2017
- Location: 1339 South Park Ave; Buffalo, New York, United States
- Coordinates: 42°51′32″N 78°50′24″W
- Industry: Automotive; Renewable energy
- Products: Solar Roof; Supercharger
- Employees: 1,804 (early 2024)
- Area: Floor area: 1,200,000 sq ft (110,000 m^{2})
- Owner: State of New York
- Website: tesla.com/gigafactory2

Gigafactory New York (also known as Giga New York or Gigafactory 2) is a factory leased by Tesla, Inc. in the Riverbend section of Buffalo, New York. The factory, owned by the State of New York, was built on brownfield land remediated from a former steel mill. Construction of the factory started in 2014 and was completed in 2017. It produces the Tesla Solar Roof and Tesla Superchargers. Additionally, Tesla employs data analysts for its Autopilot software at the site.

The plant was a component of New York Governor Andrew Cuomo's "Buffalo Billion" stimulus package to provide US$1 billion in investments in the Buffalo area. In 2013, Cuomo announced that lighting manufacturer Soraa and solar panel manufacturer Silevo would share the site. SolarCity purchased Silevo in 2014, and SolarCity was acquired by Tesla in 2016. The companies announced plans to increase the manufacturing operations and employment at the site, bumping Soraa out of the plant, and New York’s total investment in the factory increased to $959 million. The plant has been criticized as offering little economic benefit in exchange for the significant state funding it received.

Between 2017 and 2020, Tesla's partner Panasonic built solar panels in the building and helped Tesla begin production of its Solar Roof solar shingles. However, the Solar Roof product proved challenging to produce, and Panasonic decided to exit the solar business in 2020. That same year, Tesla began Supercharger construction and Autopilot labeling work at the plant and increased number of employees at the plant, eventually fulfilling its job creation commitments to New York State.

== History ==
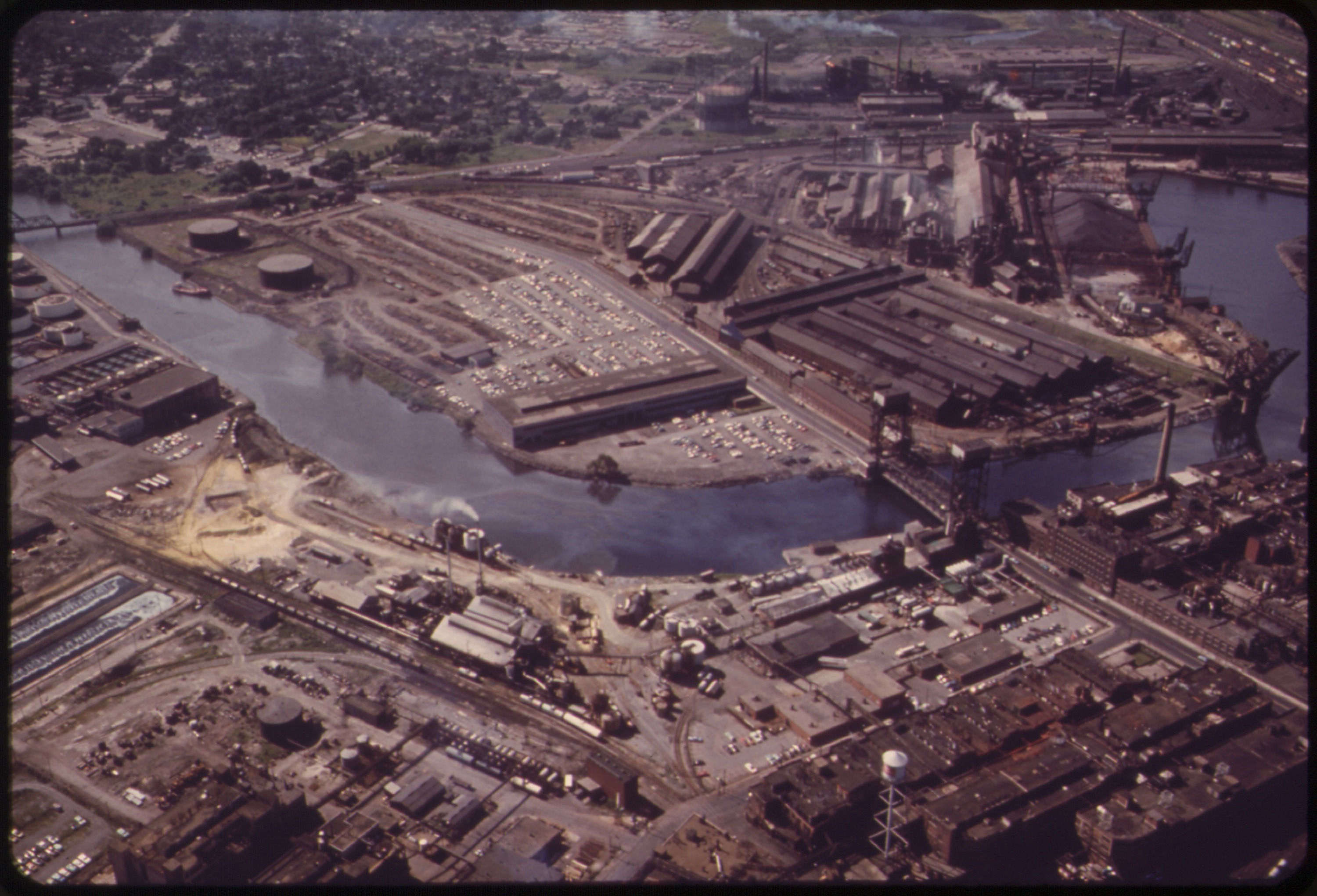
The large Republic Steel mill that occupied the site before Tesla

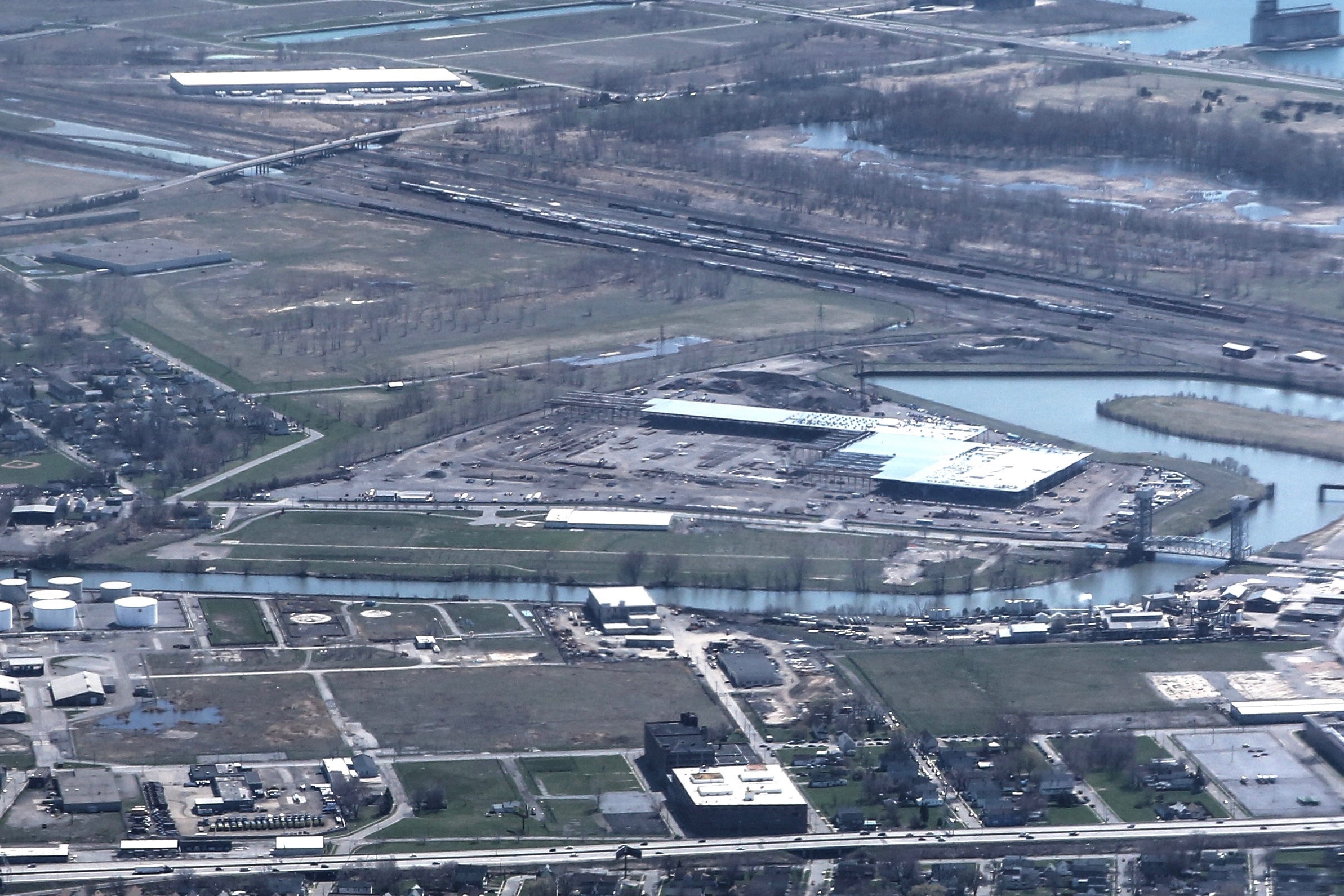
Gigafactory under construction in 2015

=== Background ===
The 88-acre Riverbend site in South Buffalo, along the Buffalo River, was once home to a Republic Steel mill and the Donner Hanna Coke plant. The steel plant closed in 1984. In his January 2012 State of the State address, Cuomo offered up to $1 billion in economic development incentives to bring jobs to Buffalo, then the third-poorest city in the country. The plan became known as the "Buffalo Billion". In November 2013, Cuomo announced the Buffalo High-Tech Manufacturing Innovation Hub at Riverbend, a $225 million state project to build a clean-energy campus on the former Republic Steel brownfield. The first two tenants were to be LED lighting maker Soraa and solar panel maker Silevo, and Silevo promised 475 permanent jobs. The project was run through the Fort Schuyler Management Corporation, a nonprofit affiliate of the State University of New York Polytechnic Institute (SUNY Poly) that owns state-funded high-tech buildings, including in Buffalo, and leases them to companies.

In 2014, SolarCity detailed plans to acquire Silevo for $200 million, subsequently scaling up plans for the Buffalo gigafactory. The company outlined a construction timetable and hiring goals promising an eventual 3,000 jobs in Buffalo with 5,000 statewide, and $5 billion in economic activity. The new plans abandoned the research center design in favor of the construction of a 1.2 million square foot factory. As a result, the state increased the incentives offered to $750 million. Because the SolarCity project was to be so big, New York bumped Soraa out of the plant.

In 2015, SolarCity's CEO, Lyndon Rive, stated that the new facility would be key to creating a clean energy-manufacturing market, adding that expansion would not be possible at the Riverbend plant, but more likely in the immediate area.

In April 2017, Cuomo secured another $500 million for the Buffalo Billion project, about half of which went into the Tesla facility, bringing New York’s total investment in the factory to $959 million.

=== Construction ===
Cuomo broke ground on the site on September 23, 2014, and work on the building's steel frame began in February 2015. In October 2015, at SolarCity's request, the state amended the jobs agreement to drop the requirement that the 1,460 jobs be "high-tech" and to cut the number that had to be in manufacturing at the plant from 900 to 500.

By the summer of 2016, SolarCity was about $3 billion in debt and nearly out of cash. Tesla announced it would acquire the company. To convince Tesla shareholders to approve the deal, Musk rushed to launch a prototype of the Tesla Solar Roof, a solar shingle, unveiling it in October 2016. At the time, Musk predicted that 1,000 Solar Roofs would be produced weekly in Buffalo. Tesla and SolarCity employees, along with bankers advising on the deal later said that they were blindsided by the announcement, saying that the product was still in the early design stage. Following a demonstration of the product, Tesla's shareholders approved the purchase. Alain Kaloyeros, the president of SUNY Poly, was indicted in 2016 and convicted in 2018 of rigging the bidding so that LP Ciminelli would win the $750 million contract to build the factory. The U.S. Supreme Court overturned the convictions in 2023, and in December 2025 Kaloyeros pleaded guilty to wire fraud and was fined $100,000, with no further jail time.

SolarCity took control of the finished building in September 2016, and Tesla could use it from November 1, 2016. The state did not formally deem the factory complete until April 30, 2018, the date from which Tesla's job and investment targets were measured.

=== Operations ===
To build the panels, Tesla outsourced production of the solar cells to Panasonic. The two companies had worked together to build batteries at Tesla's Gigafactory Nevada. Panasonic had 30 years of experience producing solar panels. The partnership allowed Tesla to reduce its reliance on debt. Panasonic started production at the factory at the end of August 2017, at first assembling modules from solar cells imported from Japan. It began making the cells in Buffalo in February 2018. At the beginning of production, Panasonic built traditional solar panels in Buffalo instead of solar shingles. The Japanese company employed about 400 people in Buffalo. The technology used incorporates nanotechnology, for which New York colleges and universities such as SUNY Poly and Erie Community College have developed programs and research, with the latter offering semiconductor and nanotechnology programs specifically for employment at the gigafactory.

In January 2018, Tesla announced, after testing on employees' roofs, that it would begin installing its new product on commercial customers' homes "within the next few months". The Tesla Solar Roof proved to be challenging to build. Panasonic had to solve several engineering problems to make the modules work, and when completed, Tesla insisted on additional development to make the modules appear black instead of the blue-green color of the initial units. Tesla blamed the delays in Solar Roof production on its focus on the ramp up of the Tesla Model 3. By mid-2018, Panasonic was making about 1,900 conventional solar panels a day at the plant. Because Tesla was buying few of its products, Panasonic began selling some panels under its own brand and shipping cells to other possible buyers, and it then paused production to install new equipment. By the end of May 2018, only twelve Tesla Solar Roofs had been connected to the grid in California, at a cost per watt about double the national average for solar systems.

Tesla said in March 2020 that the factory had reached Musk's target of 1,000 Solar Roofs a week, a figure that counted each roof as a small 4 kW system. In February 2020, Panasonic decided to leave the factory, and it ended production there in mid-2020. Even after the Solar Roof entered production, Tesla struggled to produce the modules in great volume. Three years later, in 2023, industry analyst Wood Mackenzie reported that only 3,000 Solar Roofs are in use. In a tweet, Tesla disputed the Wood Mackenzie report, calling it “incorrect by a large margin,” but did not clarify what was incorrect.

In 2019, Tesla began making electrical components for its Superchargers and for its Powerwall and Powerpack batteries at the factory, partly to add jobs before its 2020 hiring deadline. Tesla also moved more than 600 employees to the building to be entry-level data analysts for its Autopilot software. A spokesperson for the Empire State Development Corporation, the agency that has oversight of the factory, said that in 2022 the company complied with its investment and employment goals.

In January 2024, Governor Kathy Hochul announced that Tesla would spend $500 million on a Dojo supercomputer at the factory. Days earlier Musk had called Dojo a "long shot", and he said Tesla would spend more than that on Nvidia hardware that year. Tesla dropped the Dojo project in August 2025. The same year, Tesla and Empire State Development negotiated a new ten-year lease running to 2034. It replaced the original 2014 lease, under which Tesla paid $1 a year. Under the draft terms, Tesla would pay $2 million a year through 2029 and $5 million a year after that, and its job target in Buffalo would rise from 1,460 to 1,800. In 2025, the company began producing its TSP-420 solar panel at the factory, launching it commercially the following year, although Buffalo’s capacity is a modest 300 MW per year, and the company plans to make the bulk of its solar panels in Houston.

== Jobs commitment ==
Tesla's agreement with the state required it to have 1,460 jobs at the Buffalo factory by April 2020 or pay a $41.2 million penalty. To prepare for Tesla’s arrival and a wave of solar-manufacturing jobs, Buffalo built a $44 million training center in 2019. The center, which graduated about 500 people in its four years of operation, sent only about 20 people to work at Tesla, most of them as equipment-maintenance technicians.

Before the COVID-19 shutdown in March 2020, Tesla said 1,834 people worked at the Buffalo factory, including 376 Panasonic employees who were due to leave as Panasonic pulled out. Due to the COVID-19 pandemic, however, employment at the factory decreased to 474 as of April 30, 2020, and the company requested and received another year to meet its hiring commitment. The company received another extension until the end of 2021 to reach the employment target at the plant. If it had failed to meet that deadline, the state could have imposed a $41 million fine. By the end of 2021, the number of employees at the factory had increased to more than 1,460, meeting the commitment.

== Criticism and lawsuit ==
The project has been criticized for job promises that were later scaled back, construction delays, cost overruns and bid rigging, and Musk was criticized for never visiting the plant in its early years. Critics of Tesla's purchase of SolarCity, which was run by Musk's cousins Lyndon and Peter Rive, called it a conflict of interest and a bailout. In April 2022, after a trial, the Delaware Court of Chancery ruled for Musk in a lawsuit by Tesla shareholders over the SolarCity purchase. The judge found that Musk "was more involved in the process than a conflicted fiduciary should be", but that the board had "meaningfully vetted the Acquisition" and that "Tesla's value has massively increased following the Acquisition". The Delaware Supreme Court upheld the ruling in June 2023.

A 2020 audit by the New York State Comptroller found that Empire State Development's own analysis showed only $0.54 in economic benefit for every $1 spent on the project, far below the agency's usual benchmark of $30. After an accounting change in 2019, state officials wrote down more than $1 billion in high-tech project assets, including the Buffalo factory. By 2023, most of the solar manufacturing equipment the state had bought for the plant had been scrapped or sold at a discount. E. J. McMahon of the Empire Center for Public Policy, a fiscally conservative think tank, said the plant "may rank as the single biggest economic development boondoggle in American history". A spokesperson for Cuomo defended the project, saying more people now work on the site than when it was an empty former steel mill lot.

== See also ==
- List of Tesla factories
