= Photoactive layer =

A photoactive layer is used in solar cells for absorbing light. It can be found in all solar cells, but with different panels the photoactive layer is made of different materials. Inorganic layers are made from inorganic materials such as silicon. The film has a layer arrangement of electrodes and counter electrode with organic layers in between the two. The layer is found underneath the glass, adhesive, and reflection coating, but is the first required part of the cell.

== Definition ==
Photoactive means it can have a chemical reaction with sunlight and/or ultraviolet light. Most of the solar cell is photoactive, but the base of the solar cell only conducts electricity after it has been converted. It can also mean that it responds to photons photoelectrically. This can also relate to a physical reaction, but this does not occur within photoactive layers.

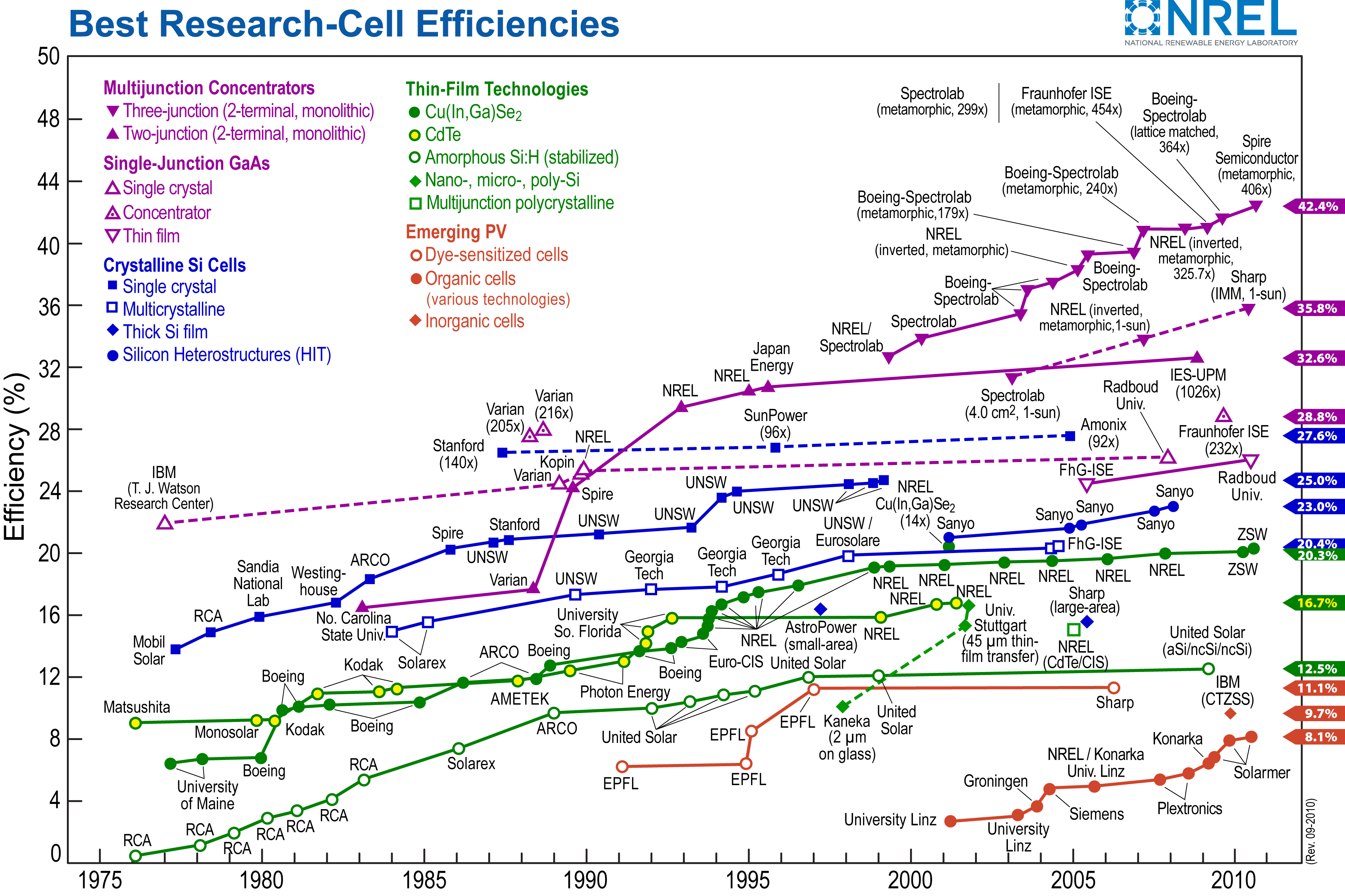
Reported timeline of solar cell energy conversion efficiencies (from National Renewable Energy Laboratory (USA)

== Efficiency ==
Layers that are thicker are sometimes preferred because they can absorb more light. While sometimes thinner ones are preferred for greater efficiency. The light must pass through the band gap. For this to work the light must have a minimum energy depending on the cell to pass through. Different cells have a different minimum while the light below the minimum passes through the absorber.

== See also ==
- Photovoltaic module
- Solar Cell
- Amorphous silicon
- Green technology
- Solar shingles
- Timeline of solar energy
