= Tesla Energy =

American solar energy generation and battery energy storage company

Tesla Energy Operations, Inc.
- Type: Division
- Industry: Renewable energy
- Predecessors: SolarCity; Zep Solar
- Founded: April 30, 2015; 11 years ago
- Products: Solar panels; Solar Roof; Powerwall; Megapack
- Production output: ▲31.4 GWh battery energy storage systems (2024); ▼223 MW solar (2023)
- Revenue: ▲US$10.1 billion (2024)
- Net income: ▲US$2.6 billion (2024)
- Total assets: ▲US$4.9 billion (2024)
- Parent: Tesla, Inc.
- Website: tesla.com/energy
- Footnotes; Financials as of December 31, 2024. References

Tesla Energy Operations, Inc. is the sustainable energy division of Tesla, Inc. that develops, manufactures, sells and installs photovoltaic solar energy generation systems, battery energy storage products and other related products and services to residential, commercial and industrial customers.

The division was founded on April 30, 2015, when Tesla CEO Elon Musk announced that the company would apply the battery technology it developed for electric cars to a home energy storage system called the Powerwall. In November 2016, Tesla acquired SolarCity, in a US$2.6 billion deal, and added solar energy generation to Tesla Energy's business. This deal was controversial; at the time of the acquisition, SolarCity was facing liquidity issues.

The company's current power generation products include solar panels (manufactured by other companies for Tesla), the Tesla Solar Roof (a solar shingle system), and the Tesla Solar Inverter. The company also makes a large-scale energy storage system called the Megapack. Additionally, Tesla develops software to support its energy products.

In 2023, the company deployed solar energy systems capable of generating 223 megawatts (MW), a decrease of 36% over 2022. In 2024, it deployed 31.4 gigawatt-hours (GWh) of battery energy storage products, an increase of 113% over 2023. The division generated $10.1 billion in revenue for the company in 2024, a 67% increase over 2023.

== History ==
=== Tesla's expansion into battery energy storage ===
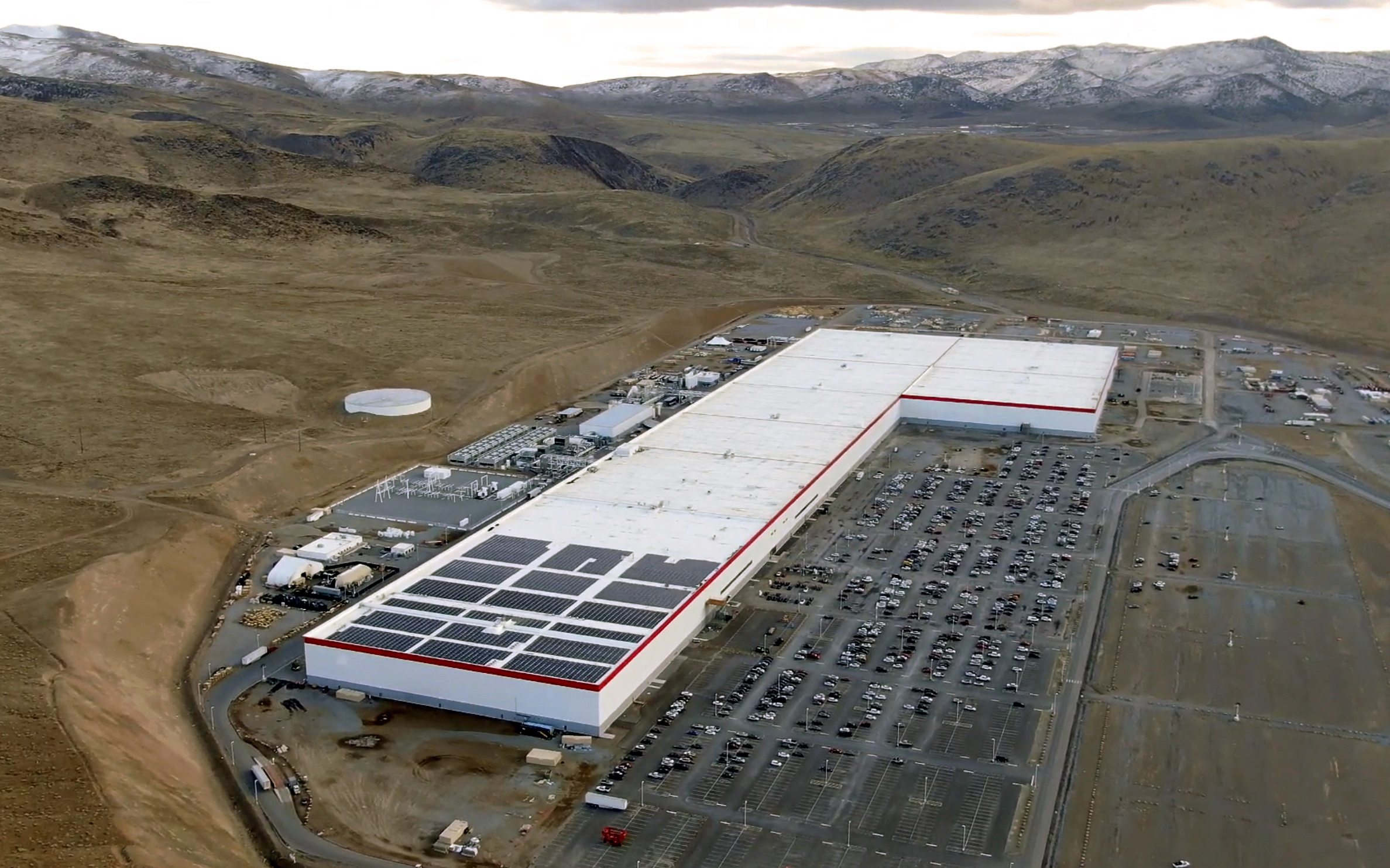
Giga Nevada, Tesla's battery factory

As Tesla, Inc. developed batteries for its electric car business, the company also started experimenting with using batteries for energy storage. Starting in 2012, Tesla installed prototype battery packs (later called the Powerpack) at the locations of a few industrial customers. In November 2013, Tesla announced that it would build Giga Nevada, a factory to produce lithium-ion batteries.

The Tesla Energy brand was introduced on April 30, 2015, as CEO Elon Musk announced that the company would apply its battery technology to a home energy storage system called the Powerwall. Five hundred pilot units were built at the Tesla Fremont Factory in California and installed during 2015. The Giga Nevada factory started limited production of Powerwalls and Powerpacks in the first quarter of 2016 using battery cells produced elsewhere, and began mass production of cells in January 2017. This battery technology is not an innovation of what is available in the market but, according to Musk, the company offered a product that is easy to install, more attractive, less expensive and can also be easily maintained.

=== Tesla buys SolarCity ===
Brothers Peter and Lyndon Rive, the cousins of Tesla CEO Elon Musk, founded SolarCity in 2006 to sell and install solar energy generation systems as well as other related products and services to residential, commercial and industrial customers. Musk suggested the solar company idea to the Rive brothers and he later served as the chairman of SolarCity.

In June 2014, SolarCity committed to building a second factory, later called Giga New York, in Buffalo, New York, that would build photovoltaic cells and would be triple the size of the next largest photovoltaic manufacturing plant in the United States.

By 2016, SolarCity had installed solar energy systems for over 325,000 customers and was one of the largest solar installation companies in the United States.

On August 1, 2016, Tesla announced that it would be acquiring SolarCity in an all-stock $2.6 billion acquisition. Tesla's mission since its inception has been "to accelerate the world's transition to sustainable energy". Musk said the purchase would advance Tesla's mission by helping the world move from a mine-and-burn hydrocarbon economy towards a solar electric economy. The announcement cited (as benefits of the acquisition) operational and cost synergies, as well as allowing for integrated sales of products from Tesla's existing battery energy storage products division. The announcement of the deal resulted in a more than 10% drop in Tesla's stock price.

The proposal for acquisition was approved by antitrust regulators in August 2016. More than 85% of unaffiliated shareholders of Tesla and SolarCity voted to approve the acquisition on November 17, allowing the deal to close on November 21, 2016.

=== Tesla Energy product roll-out ===
Shortly after the acquisition announcement, Tesla announced that it would be building a new version of the Powerwall and also introduced the Tesla Solar Roof, a solar shingle product. Elon Musk presented the products using the homes on Colonial Street set on the Universal Studios backlot. The presentation was intended to gain investor support for the acquisition. These roof tiles were later revealed to be not "fully working". Members of the anti-Tesla group TSLAQ have cited Musk's fake solar roof tile reveal as a major point of contention and an impetus for organizing.

The Solar Roof was to be made at the Giga New York factory, which opened in late August 2017 and would be operated as a joint venture with Panasonic. The factory was not able to start producing the shingles in volume until March 2020 and Panasonic left the joint venture in early 2020, before it exited the solar business entirely in January 2021.

In mid-2017, several of the former SolarCity executives left the company. Chief policy officer John Wellinghoff departed in April 2017, co-founder Lyndon Rive left in June 2017, and his brother Peter left shortly thereafter.

=== Business model shift ===
Tesla Energy shifted its business model compared to SolarCity, with Tesla saying that it was focusing on projects with higher margins, such as those that include a Powerwall.

SolarCity heavily focused on door-to-door sales of leased systems, where customers would pay no upfront costs, but agree to purchase the power generated by those panels from the company for 20 years. Leases became the most popular solar business model in the US and made SolarCity the largest residential installer, but left the company over $1.5 billion in debt by 2016. SolarCity's leases were also criticized by consumer advocates and government regulators.

Tesla Energy's business model is based around making their systems "the lowest-cost solar in the United States". As of 2021, the company sells systems at $2 per watt for solar panels before federal tax credits. Tesla says the business model was enabled by eliminating door-to-door sales, advertising, and some complex financing instruments (like leases). The shift in business model has been blamed for diminished customer support. Customers said they waited weeks for replies to emails and experienced long delays for administrative steps to be completed.

As a result of the shift in business model, total solar installations declined after the Tesla acquisition. In the second quarter of 2019, Tesla quarterly installations fell to a low of 29 megawatts, compared to SolarCity's installation of 253 megawatts in the fourth quarter of 2015 (before Tesla acquired it), and compared to 2,013 megawatts the residential leader Sunrun installed. Analysts believe that SolarCity was "a big source of the cash-flow deficit" for Tesla in 2019.

In 2022, the company deployed solar energy systems capable of generating 348 megawatts (MW), an increase of 1% over 2021, and deployed 6.54 gigawatt-hours (GWh) of battery energy storage products, an increase of 62% over 2021. The battery figure was helped by the output of the company's Megapack factory in Lathrop, California, announced in October 2021. The division generated $3.91 billion in revenue for the company in 2022, a 40% increase over 2021.

== Products and services ==
Tesla Energy develops, builds, installs and sells solar energy generation systems, battery energy storage products, as well as other related products and services to residential, commercial and industrial customers.

=== Solar energy generation ===
==== Solar panels ====
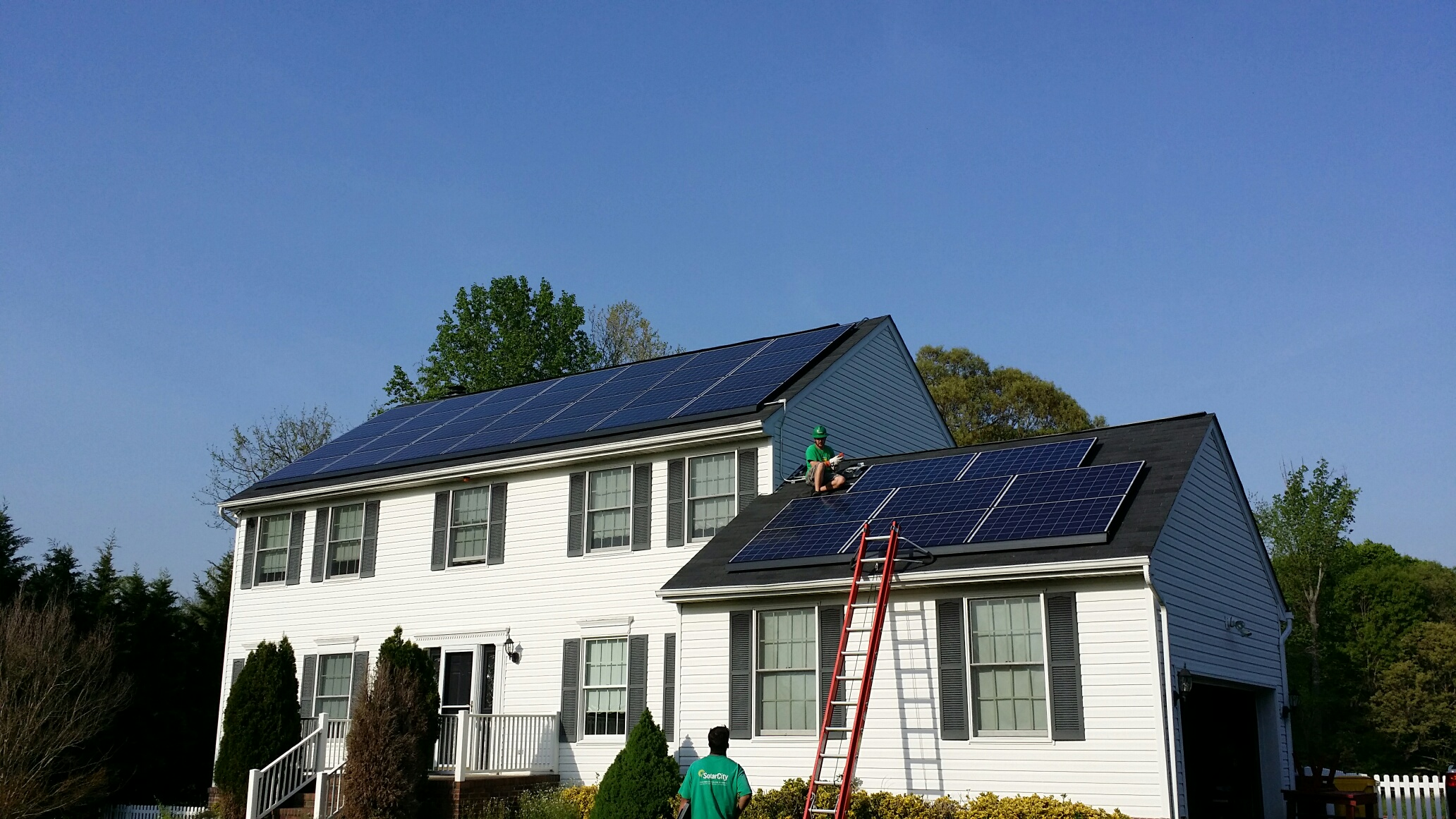
Tesla solar panel installation

Tesla Energy sells and installs traditional solar panels on existing roofs, which the company calls "retrofit solar systems" (as opposed to its Solar Roof Tiles). Unlike the company's other products, Tesla Energy does not build its own solar panels. As of April 2022, the company uses private label Tesla-branded solar panels built under contract by Qcells. Previously Tesla used panels from Panasonic as part of a larger partnership between the companies until Panasonic exited the solar business in January 2021.

The company focuses primarily on residential customers who purchase the system with cash or financing. Tesla Energy also offers systems to commercial customers in California.

Tesla Energy does not have a lease program like SolarCity, but between August 2019 and May 2021, it offered "subscription" systems to customers in Arizona, California, Connecticut, Massachusetts, New Jersey and New Mexico, in a plan to boost residential solar deployments. As opposed to a lease, customers did not need to sign a long-term agreement and may ask Tesla to deactivate the system at anytime with no penalty; Tesla charges a flat fee to remove the system.

Tesla uses proprietary mounting hardware on rooftops that eliminates the need for mounting rails and uses skirts that hide the hardware and make the panels appear to be flush with the roof. SolarCity acquired the mounting technology when it purchased Zep Solar in 2013. The "railless" system allows installers to install solar panels on the roof more quickly than other installation approaches. Traditionally, solar panel installation requires workers to first outfit roofs with mounting rails and then attach solar panels to those rails.

==== Tesla Solar Roof (discontinued) ====
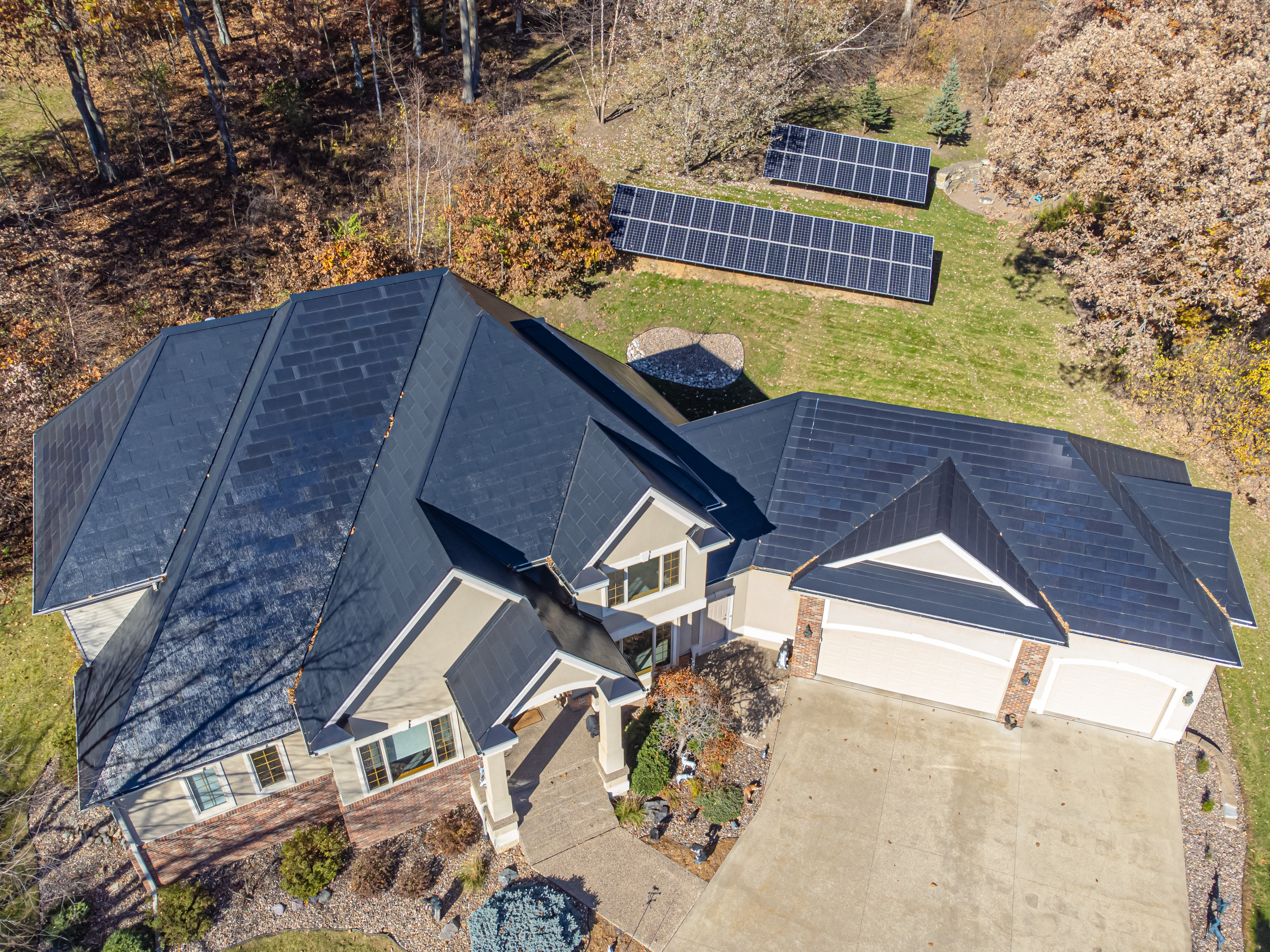
A home with a Tesla Solar Roof, the company's solar shingle

Tesla Energy manufactured, installed and sold a solar shingle product it called the Tesla Solar Roof. Solar shingles are small solar panel tiles that can make up an entire roof surface. The company claimed that a Solar Roof costs less than installing a new roof with solar panels and that the tempered glass that the tiles are made of are more durable than standard roofing tiles. The product was first unveiled in August 2016, but Tesla was only able to start producing the Solar Roof in volume in March 2020.

A report released in March 2023 estimated that Tesla had installed approximately 3,000 solar roofs in the U.S. since the launch of the product in 2016, far below initial sales projections. The product was discontinued in August 2026.

==== Tesla Solar Inverter ====
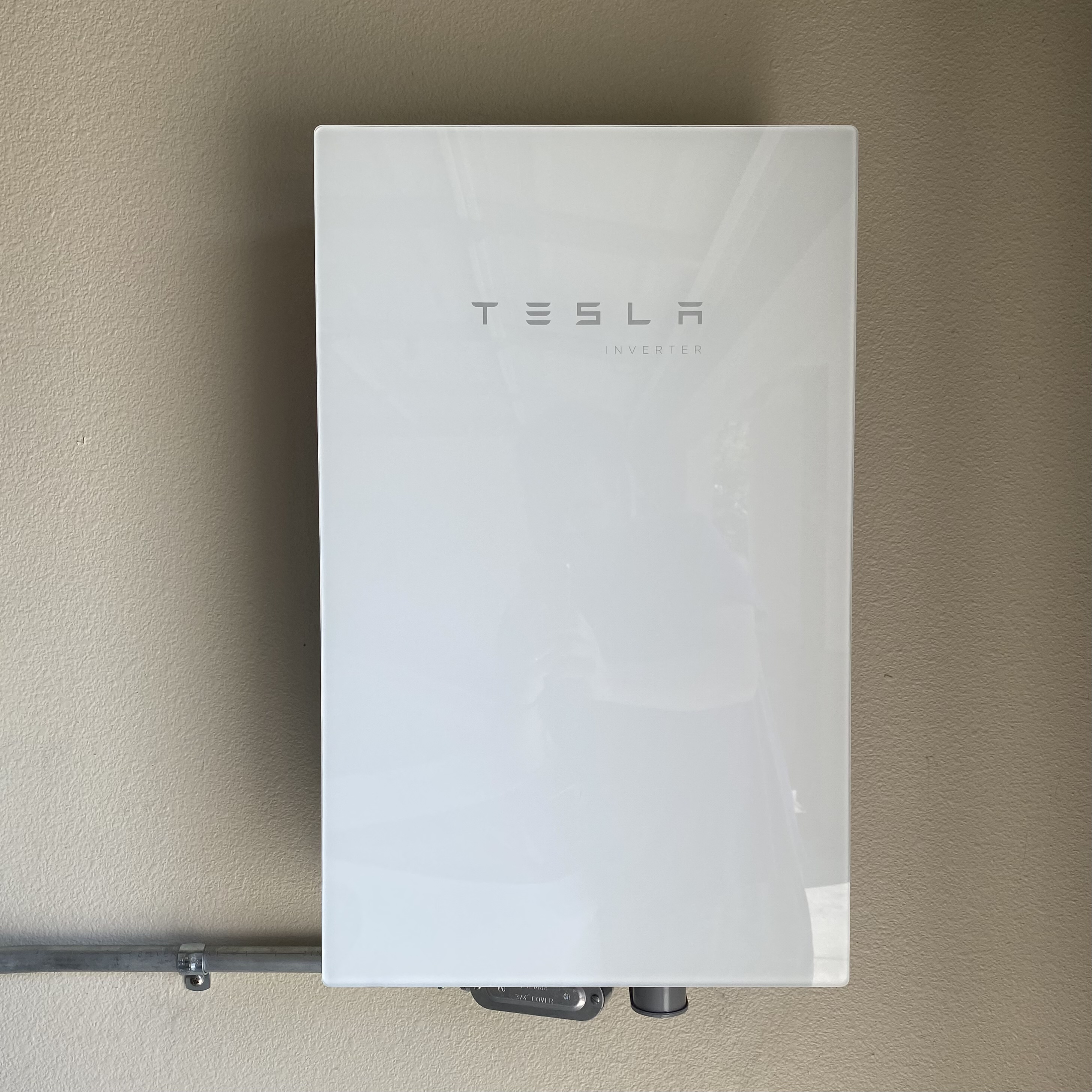
Tesla Solar Inverter

In January 2021, the company introduced its own solar inverter. The company says the Tesla Solar Inverter builds on the technology it developed for the Powerwall and electric car inverters. Like the Powerwall and Tesla's cars, the solar inverter is capable of receiving over-the-air updates through built-in cellular connectivity. The product has been noted for using older string inverter technology (many systems now use micro-inverters), but that it has the potential to drive the cost of Tesla's solar systems even lower. EnergySage, a solar buyers guide website, gave the Tesla Solar Inverter a rating of "very good", generally praising the device but noting that its efficiency ratings and 12.5-year warranty lag behind industry leaders.

The most recent version of the inverter was introduced in May 2023 and comes in four sizes: 3.8 kW, 5 kW, 5.7 kW, and 7.6 kW of AC power output. Each has four maximum power point trackers and an efficiency of 98%.

The prior version of the inverter came in two sizes: one with 3.8 kW of output, two maximum power point trackers and an efficiency of 97.5%, and the other with 7.6 kW of output, four maximum power point trackers and an efficiency of 98%. The inverter can connect to WiFi and link with the Tesla app, allowing users to monitor energy production and update the inverter's firmware.

Tesla's Powerwall+, introduced in April 2021, includes an integrated Tesla Solar Inverter.

=== Battery energy storage ===
==== Tesla Powerwall ====
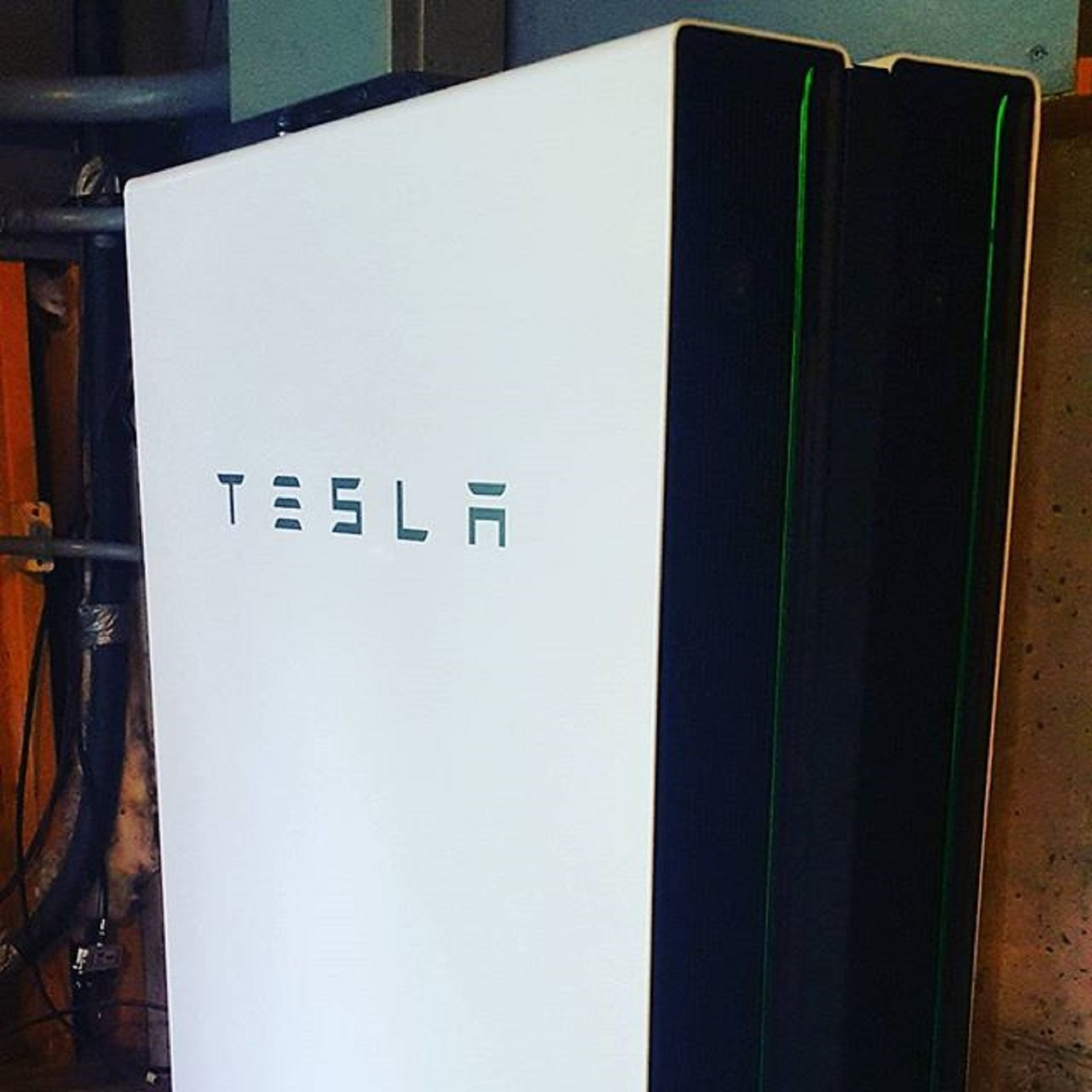
Two Tesla Powerwall 2 devices in a "stacked" configuration at a home in New York

The Tesla Powerwall is a rechargeable lithium-ion battery energy storage device intended to be used for home energy storage. The current generation Powerwall 2 is capable of storing 13.5 kilowatt-hours for solar self-consumption, time of use load shifting, and backup power.

A Powerwall system can be composed of up to 10 Powerwalls, including a combination of Powerwall+ and traditional Powerwalls. In areas where building codes allow, up to three of these devices may be "stacked" front to back to take up less space.

The Powerwall+ combines the functions of a Powerwall 2, the Tesla Solar Inverter and a Backup Gateway (a system controller and transfer switch). The combination simplifies installation and allows for even greater power delivery during periods of full sun.

==== Tesla Megapack ====
The Tesla Megapack is large-scale rechargeable lithium-ion battery energy storage devices intended for use by a business or an electric utility company.

The Megapack is capable of storing up to 3 megawatt-hours and is built as a containerized product intended for use by utility companies, typically as part of a battery storage power station, and can be used for renewable energy supply smoothing, voltage support, capacity support, microgrids, frequency regulation, and voltage control.

==== Tesla Powerpack (discontinued) ====
The Tesla Powerpack was a large-scale rechargeable lithium-ion battery energy storage device intended for use by a business or on smaller projects from power utilities.

The Powerpack is capable of storing 232 kilowatt-hours and is intended for use by businesses or for smaller utility company projects and can be used for peak shaving, load shifting, backup power, demand response, microgrids, renewable power integration, frequency regulation, and voltage control. The first prototype Powerpacks were installed in 2012 at the locations of a few industrial customers. After July 22, 2022, the product was no longer listed for sale.

=== Related services ===
For large-scale customers, Tesla Energy operates an online platform which allows for automated, real-time power trading, demand forecasting and product control. In March 2021, the company said its online products were managing over 1.2 GWh of storage. For home customers, the company operates a virtual power company in Texas called Tesla Electric, which uses the company's online platforms to manage customers' Powerwall devices, discharging them into the grid to sell power when prices are high, earning money for customers.

== Controversies and lawsuits ==
=== SolarCity purchase ===
Some investors criticized the 2016 purchase of SolarCity, calling it "a misguided effort to rescue two companies that depend on investors and the government for operating cash." In 2019, multiple shareholder groups filed a lawsuit against Musk and Tesla's directors, claiming that the purchase of SolarCity was done solely to benefit his cousin Lyndon Rive (Co-founder of SolarCity) and Elon Musk and came at the expense of Tesla and its shareholders. Tesla directors settled the lawsuit in January 2020, leaving Musk the sole remaining defendant. In 2022, a Delaware court ruled in favor of Musk. "[The] Tesla Board meaningfully vetted the Acquisition, and Elon did not stand in its way. Equally if not more important, the preponderance of the evidence reveals that Tesla paid a fair price—SolarCity was, at a minimum, worth what Tesla paid for it," read the opinion by Vice Chancellor Joseph Slights.

=== Allegations of faked sales numbers at SolarCity ===
In July 2018, three former employees filed a lawsuit against SolarCity, alleging that the corporation had approved the creation of "fake sales accounts", which resulted in an "unreasonably high valuation of SolarCity" for investors. After allegedly informing management, including CEO Elon Musk, of these incidents, the employees were fired, which they argue contravenes California's whistleblower protection laws. Tesla denied the allegations of contravening whistleblower protections and, in June 2020, the case was dismissed with prejudice.

=== Walmart lawsuit and Project Titan ===
SolarCity installed and managed solar panels on the roofs of more than 240 Walmart stores. After fires on the roofs of seven of those stores, Walmart filed a lawsuit against Tesla on August 21, 2019, claiming that the fires were caused by negligent installation and maintenance that relied on "untrained and unsupervised personnel".

At around the start of the lawsuit, it was revealed that Tesla had initiated a secretive program, "Project Titan", to replace solar panel parts that could cause fires. Former employees said that Project Titan involved replacing two parts believed to be causing the fires: the connectors between the panels made by Amphenol and the power optimizers built by SolarEdge. Tesla said that it believed Project Titan was successful in addressing issues with the connectors and their higher rate of failure.

On November 9, 2019, it was announced that Walmart and Tesla had settled their lawsuit. A joint statement provided by Tesla stated the companies were "pleased to have resolved the issues raised by Walmart" concerning the installations, and looked forward to "a safe re-energization of our sustainable energy systems." The terms of the settlement were not disclosed.

=== Australian MegaPack fire ===
In July 2021, a fire ignited within a Tesla Megapack in Victoria during testing at Australia's Big Battery site, one of the largest fixed batteries in the world. The Australian County Fire Authority issued a statement to nearby suburban areas regarding possible toxic smoke. The cause of the fire was a coolant leak, and "the Megapack that started the fire had been manually disconnected from a number of monitoring, control, and data collection systems because it was undergoing testing at the time of the incident".

=== Solar Roof delays and price increase ===
Musk introduced the Tesla Solar Roof, a solar shingle product in an August 2016 presentation. It was later revealed that the shingles were fake, which would become a major point of contention with skeptics of Tesla.

In August 2017, limited production of tiles for the Solar Roof began at the company's Giga New York factory in Buffalo, New York. After testing on employees' roofs, Tesla announced in January 2018 that it would begin installing the product "within the next few months", but by July 2019, the company had only completed about a dozen roofs. In October 2019 it was reported that Tesla was "still tinkering with the product three years after announcing the concept, having done trial installations with two different iterations so far." The second version turned out to be too expensive for Tesla to manufacture in volume. Tesla was only able to start producing the Solar Roof in volume in March 2020.

On April 11, 2021, Tesla sent a message to many customers who had pre-ordered their roofs (including customers who had signed contracts well over a year prior) informing them of a cost increase of about 30% for all projects, including some that already had an agreed-upon start date. Tesla said that it would "be prioritizing customers based on the order in which they accept their updated agreements," potentially adding time for customers who had been waiting for months or a year for a new roof.

On April 26, 2021, Elon Musk admitted that the company made "significant mistakes" in their solar roof tile project, including that they did not anticipate the trouble of "assessing the difficulty of certain roofs [as the] complexity of roofs varies".

Facing a class-action lawsuit filed by Solar Roof customers, Tesla revealed that it planned to let some customers who had signed contracts before the April 2021 price changes revert to their original price.
