= Zep Solar =

Manufacturer of solar mounting equipment

- Industry: Photovoltaics
- Founded: 2009
- Founders: Jack West; Daniel Flanigan; Christina Manansala
- Defunct: November 21, 2016
- Fate: Acquired by Tesla, Inc.
- Successor: Tesla Energy
- Headquarters: San Rafael, California, United States
- Website: zepsolar.com (defunct)

Zep Solar was a manufacturer of mounting and grounding equipment for photovoltaic solar energy generation systems. The company was founded in 2009 in San Rafael, California. In 2013, Zep Solar was acquired by SolarCity, which was, at the time, the largest solar power installer in the United States. Zep Solar operated as an independent business unit until SolarCity was acquired by Tesla, Inc. in 2016, at which time Zep Solar was merged into the company's Tesla Energy subsidiary.

Since the merger, Tesla Energy has continued to manufacture many of the Zep Solar products for use on its projects but does not sell the equipment to other installers.

Zep Solar is best known for its "rail-less" system that allows solar panels to be installed on the roof more quickly than other approaches. Traditionally, solar panel installation had required workers to first outfit roofs with mounting rails and then attach solar panels to those rails. Zep Solar's technology allows installers to mount solar panels without rails on many roof types.

== History ==
Zep Solar was founded in 2009 by photovoltaic systems engineer Jack West, Christina Manansala, with whom West co-founded High Sun Engineering in 2000, and contractor Daniel Flanigan. The trio invented a system that allowed solar panels to be installed without using rails, the long aluminum beams that had typically run underneath rooftop-mounted arrays to support the panels. Rails add material and manufacturing costs and their bulk and weight add additional inefficiencies and expenses.

Instead, Zep Solar would use the inherent strength of the solar panels along with a special frame with a built-in channel called a "Zep Groove." Zep Solar system components would snap into the Zep Groove and would allow panels to be interlocked with neighboring panels using specialized couplings. The result was a fully grounded, rigid structural grid at a lower cost than using rails.

While Zep Solar was the manufacturer of most system components, they relied on photovoltaic manufacturers to build the Zep Groove into solar panels. The company signed licensing agreements with several manufacturers including Canadian Solar, JA Solar, Sharp Solar, Trina Solar and Yingli Solar. Zep Solar also sold its system components through a network of distributors.

By 2012, the Zep Solar installation system was being used by SolarCity and Vivint Solar, the two largest solar installers in the United States. At the time SolarCity said that using the Zep Solar hardware allowed them to reduce installation timelines from two or three days down to a single day.

In October 2013, SolarCity announced that it would acquire Zep Solar for US$158 million. Zep Solar would operate as an independent business unit of SolarCity and would continue to sell its equipment to other installers.

In November 2016, SolarCity was acquired by Tesla, Inc., at which time Zep Solar was merged into the company's Tesla Energy subsidiary. Since the merger, Tesla Energy has continued to manufacture many of the Zep Solar products for use on its projects but does not sell the equipment to other installers.
