= Building-integrated photovoltaics =

Photovoltaic materials used to replace conventional building materials

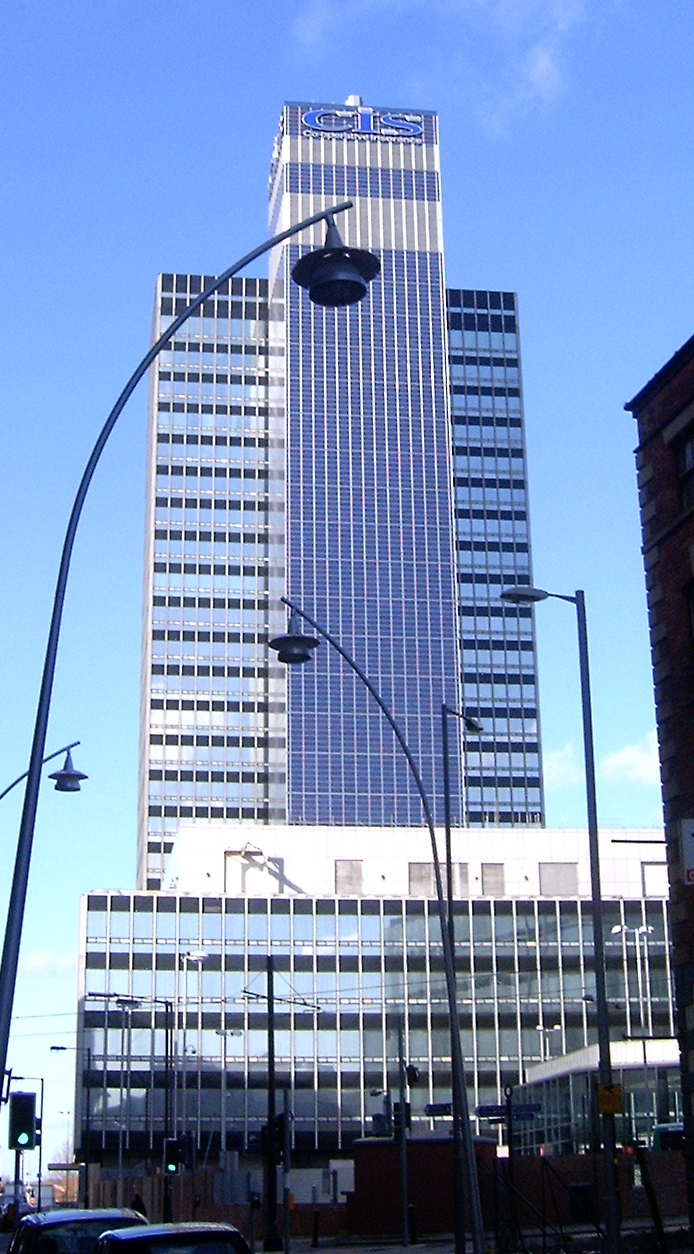
The CIS Tower in Manchester, England was clad in PV panels at a cost of £5.5 million. It started feeding electricity to the National Grid in November 2005.

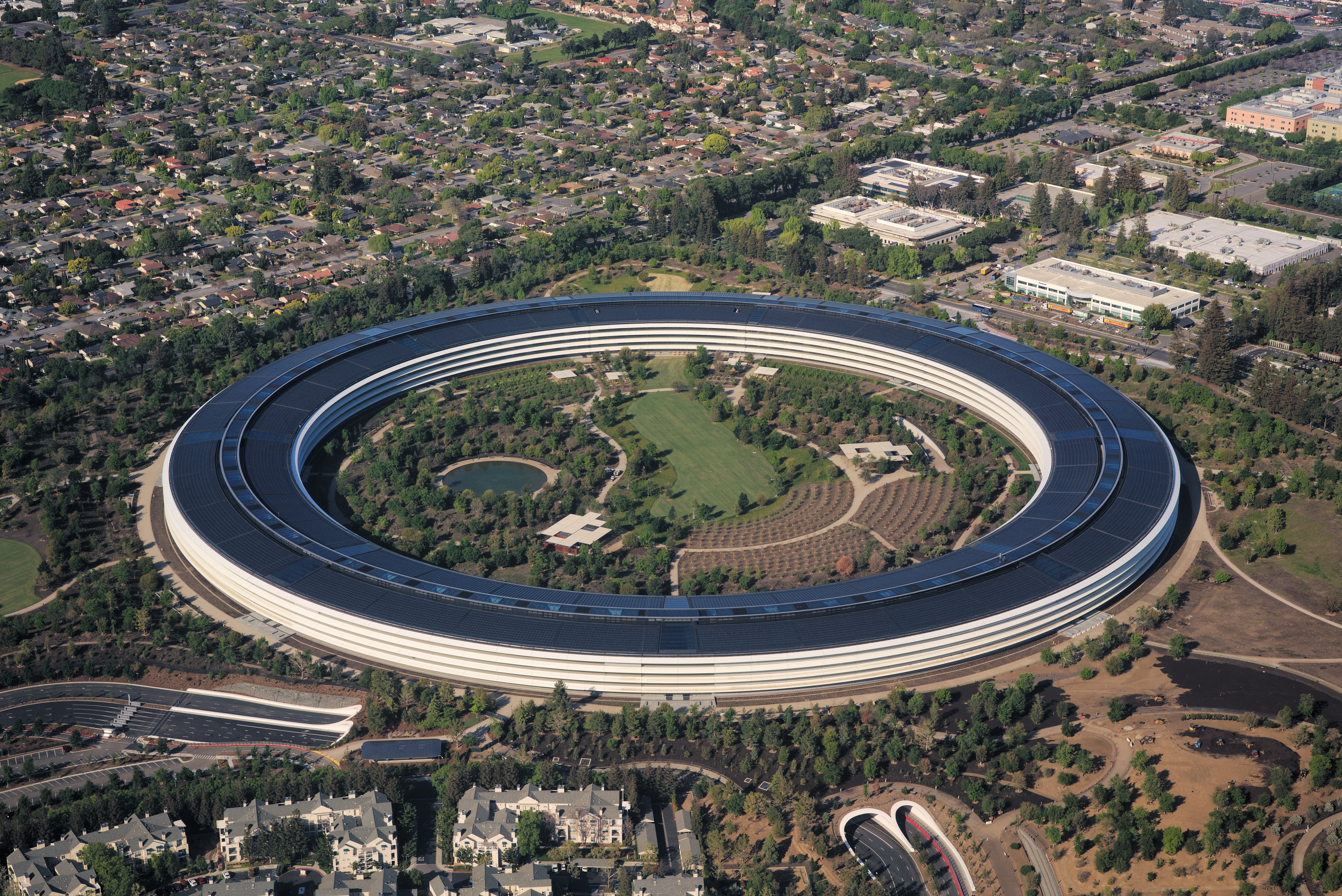
The headquarters of Apple Inc., in California. The roof is covered with solar panels.

Building-integrated photovoltaics (BIPV) are photovoltaic materials that are used to replace conventional building materials in parts of the building envelope such as the roof, skylights, or façades. They are increasingly being incorporated into the construction of new buildings as a principal or ancillary source of electrical power, although existing buildings may be retrofitted with similar technology. The advantage of integrated photovoltaics over more common non-integrated systems is that the initial cost can be offset by reducing the amount spent on building materials and labor that would normally be used to construct the part of the building that the BIPV modules replace. In addition, BIPV allows for more widespread solar adoption when the building's aesthetics matter and traditional rack-mounted solar panels would disrupt the intended look of the building.

The term building-applied photovoltaics (BAPV) is sometimes used to refer to photovoltaics that are retrofit – integrated into the building after construction is complete. Most building-integrated installations are actually BAPV. Some manufacturers and builders differentiate new construction BIPV from BAPV.

== History ==
PV applications for buildings began appearing in the 1970s. Aluminum-framed photovoltaic modules were connected to, or mounted on, buildings that were usually in remote areas without access to an electric power grid. In the 1980s photovoltaic module add-ons to roofs began being demonstrated. These PV systems were usually installed on utility-grid-connected buildings in areas with centralized power stations. In the 1990s BIPV construction products specially designed to be integrated into a building envelope became commercially available. A 1998 doctoral thesis by Patrina Eiffert, entitled An Economic Assessment of BIPV, hypothesized that one day there would be an economic value for trading Renewable Energy Credits (RECs). A 2011 economic assessment and brief overview of the history of BIPV by the U.S. National Renewable Energy Laboratory suggests that there may be significant technical challenges to overcome before the installed cost of BIPV is competitive with photovoltaic panels. However, there is a growing consensus that through their widespread commercialization, BIPV systems will become the backbone of the zero energy building (ZEB) European target for 2020. Despite the technical promise, social barriers to widespread use have also been identified, such as the conservative culture of the building industry and integration with high-density urban design. These authors suggest enabling long-term use likely depends on effective public policy decisions as much as the technological development.

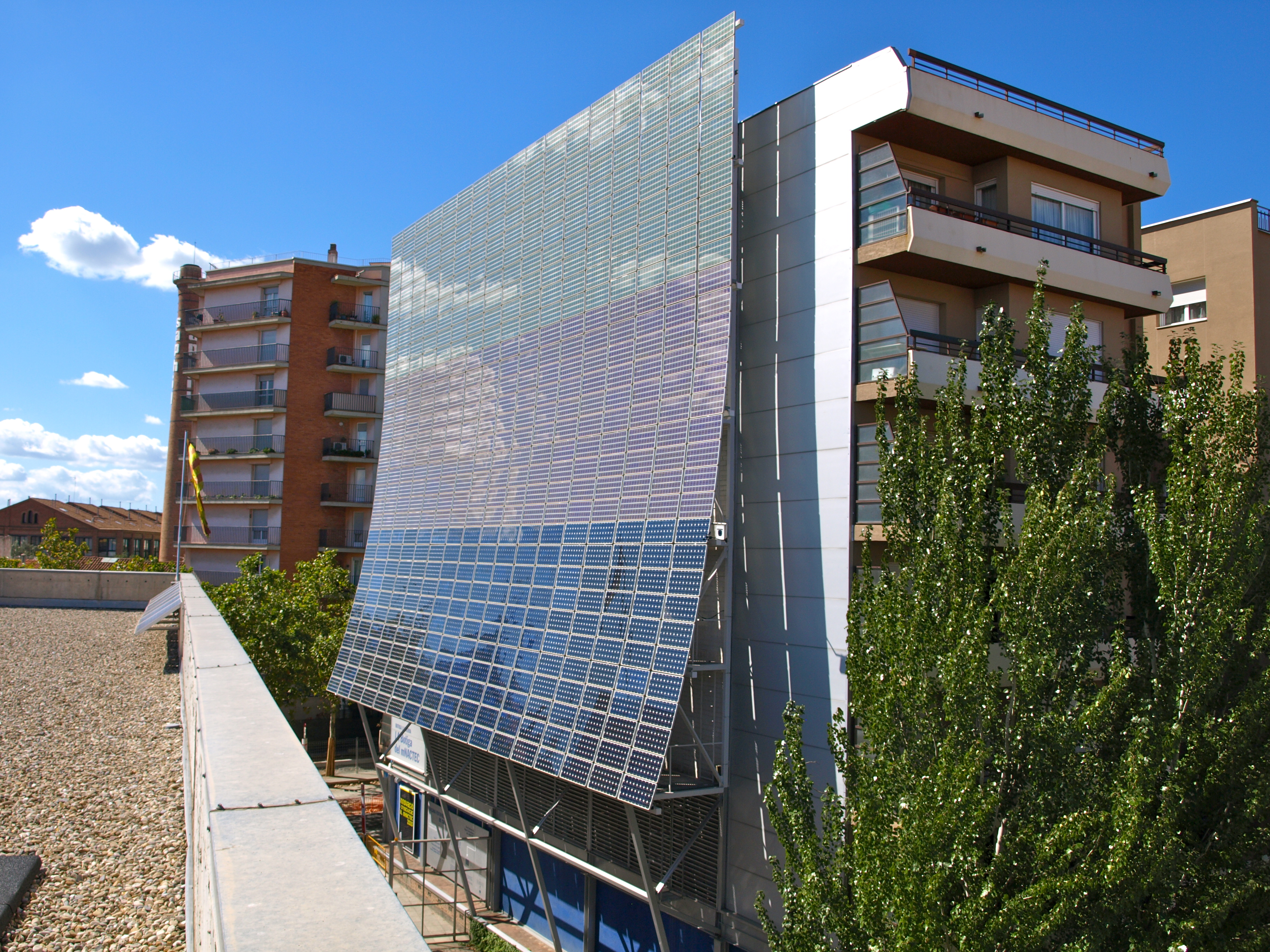
Photovoltaic wall near Barcelona, Spain

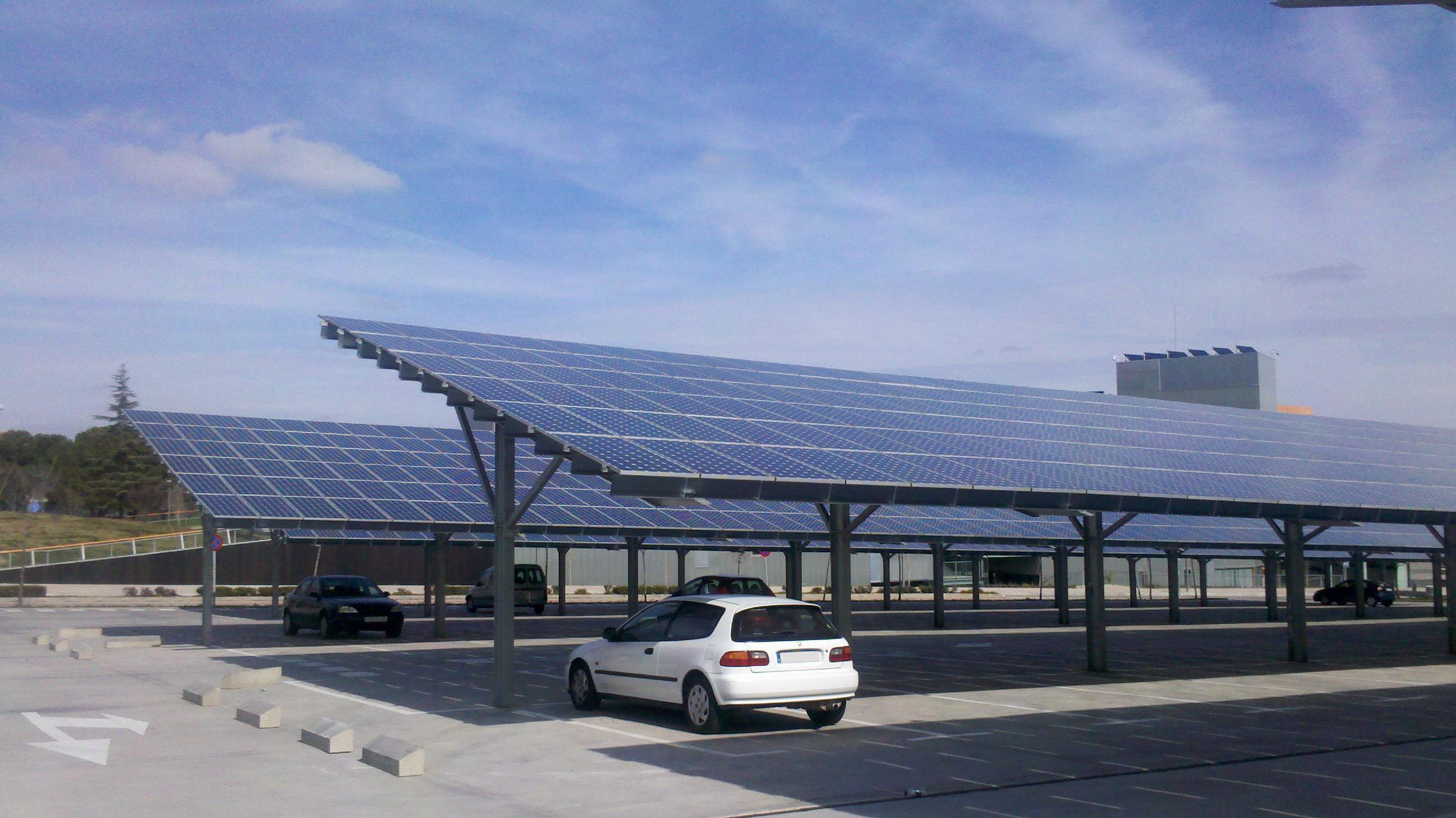
PV Solar parking canopy, Autonomous University of Madrid, Spain

== Forms ==
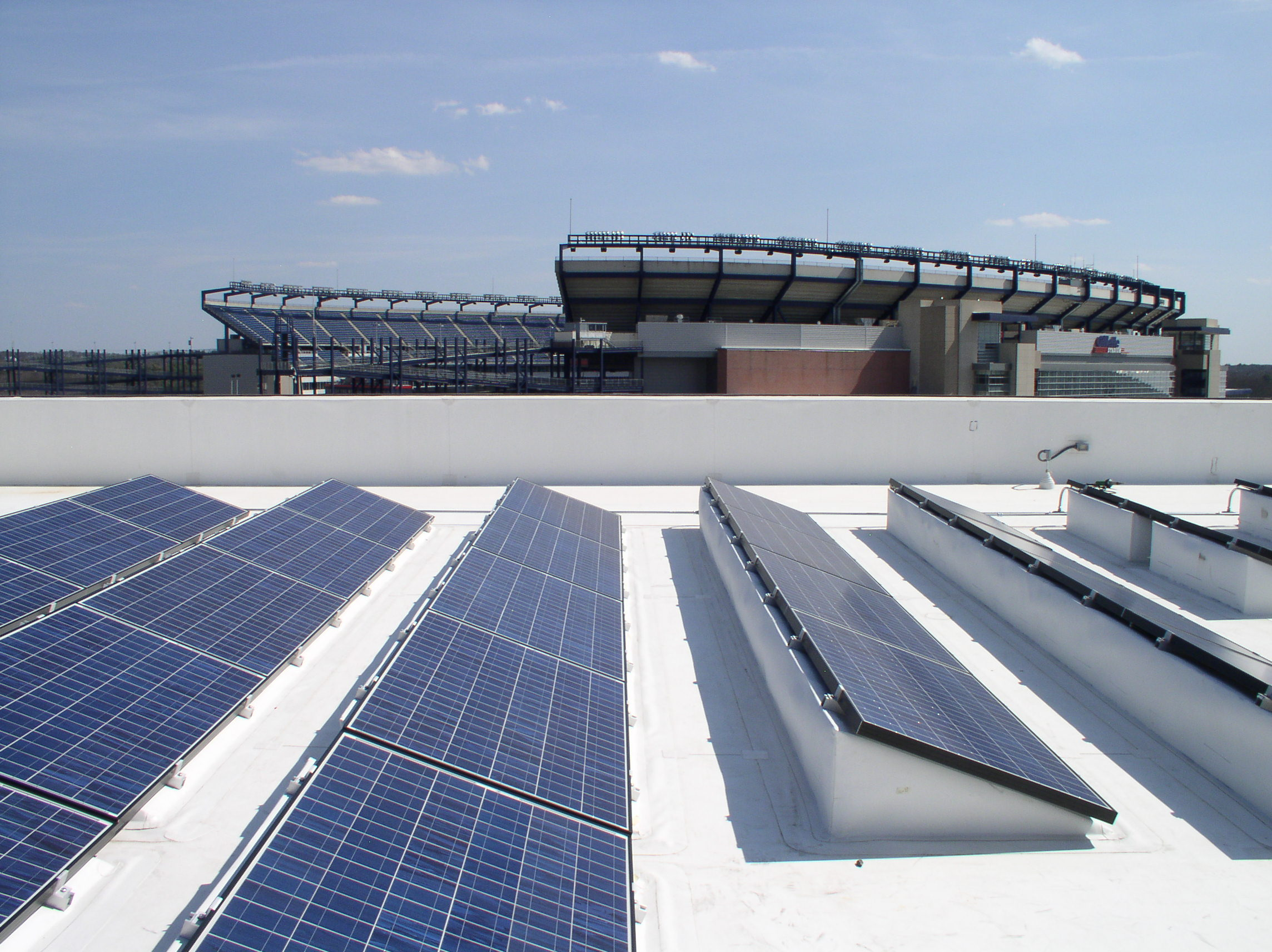
2009 Energy Project Award Winning 525 kilowatt BIPV CoolPly system manufactured by SolarFrameWorks, Co. on the Patriot Place Complex Adjacent to the Gillette Stadium in Foxborough, MA. System is installed on single-ply roofing membrane on a flat roof using no roof penetrations.

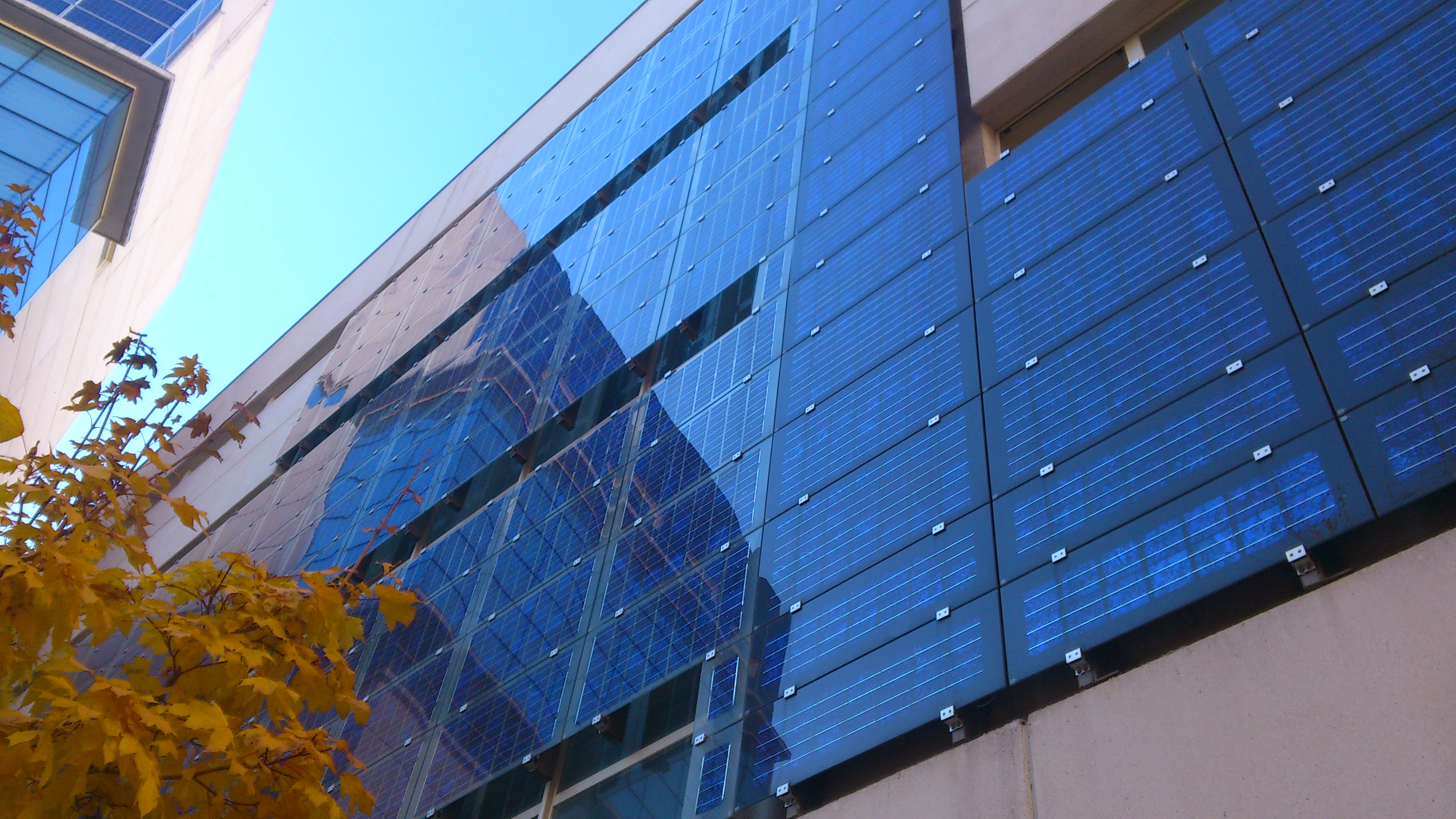
BAPV solar façade on a municipal building located in Madrid (Spain).

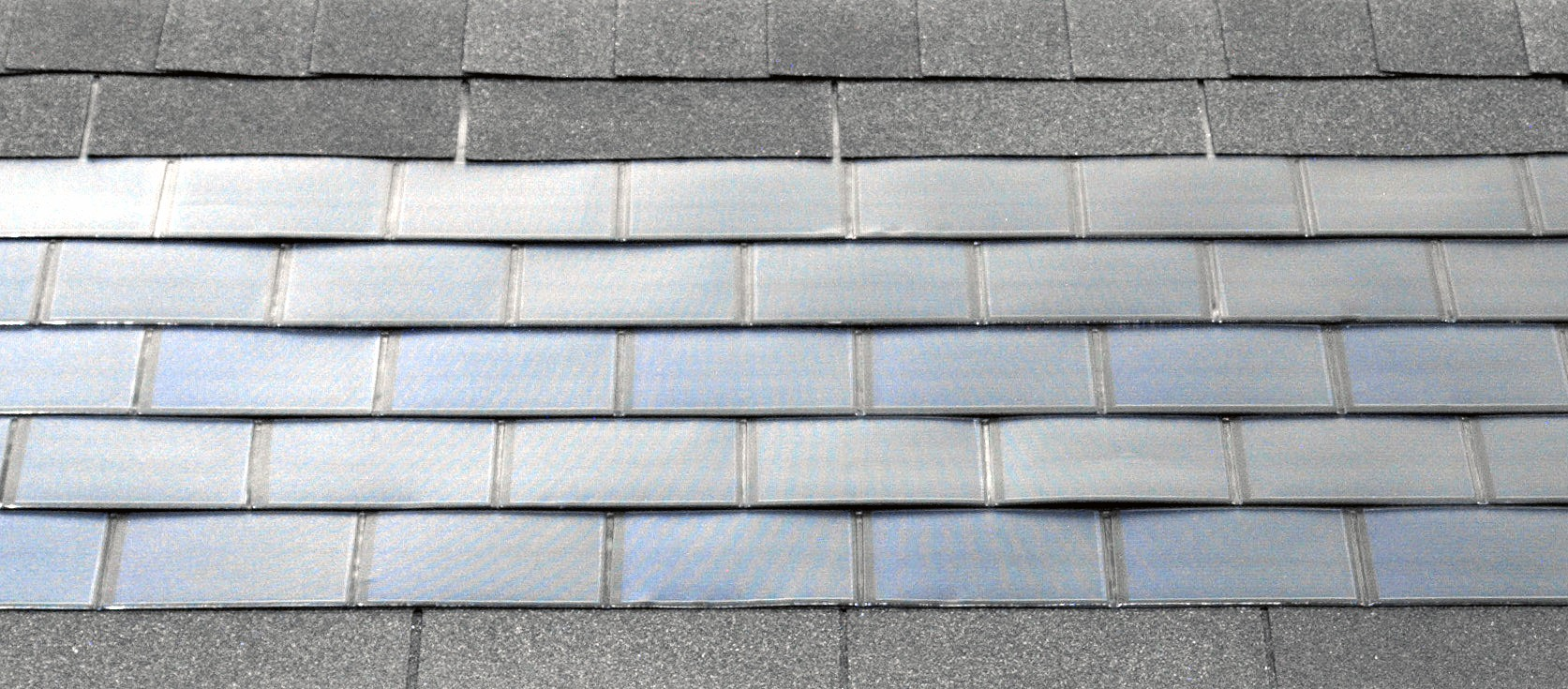
United Solar Ovonic thin-film PV building-integrated solar shingles

The majority of BIPV products use one of two technologies: Crystalline Solar Cells (c-SI) or Thin-Film Solar Cells. C-SI technologies comprise wafers of single-cell crystalline silicon which generally operate at a higher efficiency that Thin-Film cells but are more expensive to produce. The applications of these two technologies can be categorized by five main types of BIPV products:

1. Standard in-roof systems. These generally take the form of applicable strips of photovoltaic cells.
2. Semi-transparent systems. These products are typically used in greenhouse or cold-weather applications where solar energy must simultaneously be captured and allowed into the building.
3. Cladding systems. There are a broad range of these systems; their commonality being their vertical application on a building façade.
4. Solar Tiles and Shingles. These are the most common BIPV systems as they can easily be swapped out for conventional shingle roof finishes.
5. Flexible Laminates. Commonly procured in thin-sheet form, these products can be adhered to a variety of forms, primarily roof forms.

With the exception of flexible laminates, each of the above categories can utilize either c-SI or Thin-Film technologies, with Thin-Film technologies only being applicable to flexible laminates – this renders Thin-Film BIPV products ideal for advanced design applications that have a kinetic aspect.

Between the five categories, BIPV products can be applied in a variety of scenarios: pitched roofs, flat roofs, curved roofs, semi-transparent façades, skylights, shading systems, external walls, and curtain walls, with flat roofs and pitched roofs being the most ideal for solar energy capture. The ranges of roofing and shading system BIPV products are most commonly used in residential applications whereas the wall and cladding systems are most commonly used in commercial settings. Overall, roofing BIPV systems currently have more of the market share and are generally more efficient than façade and cladding BIPV systems due to their orientation to the sun.

Building-integrated photovoltaic modules are available in several forms:

- Flat roofs
  - The most widely installed to date is an amorphous thin film solar cell integrated to a flexible polymer module which has been attached to the roofing membrane using an adhesive sheet between the solar module backsheet and the roofing membrane. Copper Indium Gallium Selenide (CIGS) technology is now able to deliver cell efficiency of 17% as produced by a US-based company and comparable building-integrated module efficiencies in TPO single ply membranes by the fusion of these cells by a UK-based company.
- Pitched roofs
  - Solar roof tiles are (ceramic) roof tiles with integrated solar modules. The ceramic solar roof tile is developed and patented by a Dutch company in 2013.
  - Modules shaped like multiple roof tiles.
  - Solar shingles are modules designed to look and act like regular shingles, while incorporating a flexible thin film cell.
  - It extends normal roof life by protecting insulation and membranes from ultraviolet rays and water degradation. It does this by eliminating condensation because the dew point is kept above the roofing membrane.
Thin film solar running down standing seam metal roof
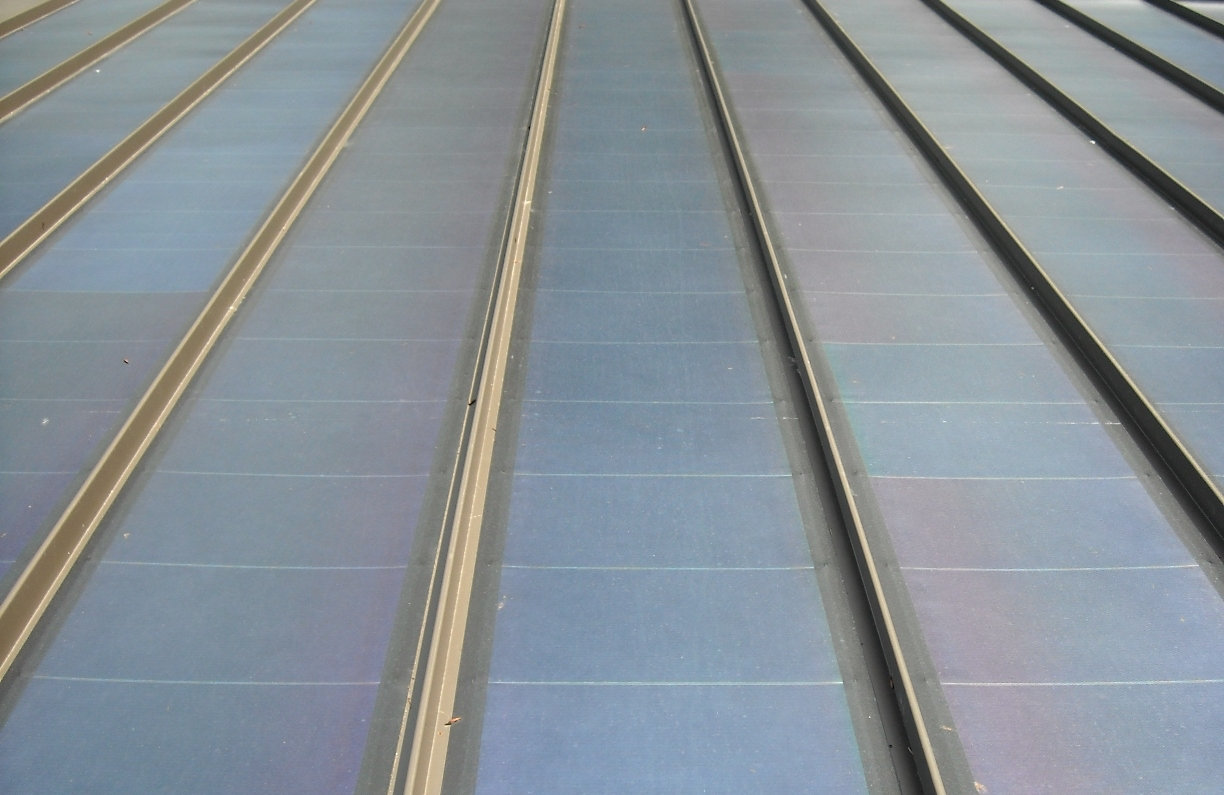
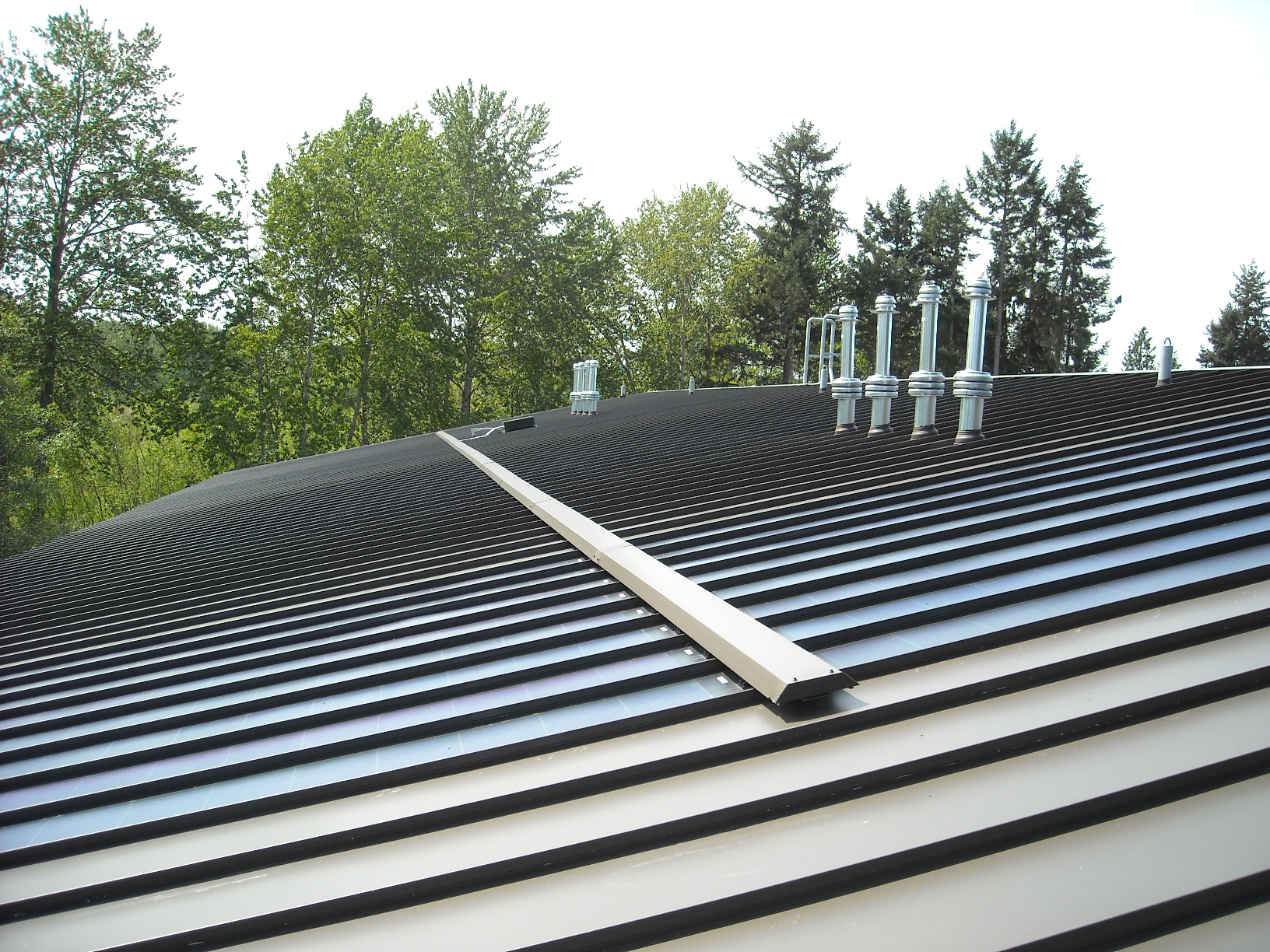

- Metal pitched roofs (both structural and architectural) are now being integrated with PV functionality either by bonding a free-standing flexible module or by heat and vacuum sealing of the CIGS cells directly onto the substrate

- Façade
  - Façades can be installed on existing buildings, giving old buildings a whole new look. These modules are mounted on the façade of the building, over the existing structure, which can increase the appeal of the building and its resale value.
- Glazing
  - Photovoltaic windows are (semi)transparent modules that can be used to replace a number of architectural elements commonly made with glass or similar materials, such as windows and skylights. In addition to producing electric energy, these can create further energy savings due to superior thermal insulation properties and solar radiation control.
- Photovoltaic Stained Glass: The integration of energy harvesting technologies into homes and commercial buildings has opened up additional areas of research which place greater considerations on the end product's overall aesthetics. While the goal is still to maintain high levels of efficiency, new developments in photovoltaic windows also aim to offer consumers optimal levels of glass transparency and/or the opportunity to select from a range of colors. Different colored 'stained glass' solar panels can be optimally designed to absorb specific ranges of wavelengths from the broader spectrum. Colored photovoltaic glass has been successfully developed using semi transparent, perovskite, and dye sensitized solar cells.
  - Plasmonic solar cells that absorb and reflect colored light have been created with Fabry-Pérot etalon technology. These cells are composed of "two parallel reflecting metal films and a dielectric cavity film between them." The two electrodes are made from Ag and the cavity between them is Sb_{2}O_{3} based. Modifying the thickness and refractance of the dielectric cavity changes which wavelength will be most optimally absorbed. Matching the color of the absorption layer glass to the specific portion of the spectrum that the cell's thickness and refractance index is best tuned to transmit both enhances the aesthetic of the cell by intensifying its color and helps to minimize photocurrent losses. 34.7% and 24.6% transmittance was achieved in red and blue light devices respectively. Blue devices can convert 13.3% of light absorbed into power, making it the most efficient across all colored devices developed and tested.
  - Perovskite solar cell technology can be tuned to red, green and blue by changing the metallic nanowire thickness to 8, 20 and 45 nm respectively. Maximum power efficiencies of 10.12%, 8.17% and 7.72% were achieved by matching glass reflectance to the wavelength that the specific cell is designed to most optimally transmit.
  - Dye-sensitized solar cells employ liquid electrolytes to capture light and convert it into usable energy; this is achieved in a similar way to how natural pigments facilitate photosynthesis in plants. While chlorophyll is the specific pigment responsible for producing the green color in leaves, other dyes found in nature such as, carotenoid and anthocyanin, produce variations of orange and purples dyes. Researchers from the University of Concepcion have proved the viability of dye sensitized colored solar cells that both appear and selectively absorb specific wavelengths of light. This low cost solution uses extracting natural pigments from maqui fruit, black myrtle and spinach as sensitizers. These natural sensitizers are then placed between two layers of transparent glass. While the efficiency levels of these particularly low cost cells remains unclear, past research in organic dye cells have been able to achieve a "high power conversion efficiency of 9.8%."

== Transparent and translucent photovoltaics ==
Transparent solar panels use a tin oxide coating on the inner surface of the glass panes to conduct current out of the cell. The cell contains titanium oxide that is coated with a photoelectric dye.

Most conventional solar cells use visible and infrared light to generate electricity. In contrast, the innovative new solar cell also uses ultraviolet radiation. Used to replace conventional window glass, or placed over the glass, the installation surface area could be large, leading to potential uses that take advantage of the combined functions of power generation, lighting and temperature control.

Another name for transparent photovoltaics is "translucent photovoltaics" (they transmit half the light that falls on them). Similar to inorganic photovoltaics, organic photovoltaics are also capable of being translucent.

=== Types of transparent and translucent photovoltaics ===
==== Non-wavelength-selective ====
Some non-wavelength-selective photovoltaics achieve semi-transparency by spatial segmentation of opaque solar cells. This method uses any type of opaque photovoltaic cell and spaces several small cells out on a transparent substrate. Spacing them out in this way reduces power conversion efficiencies dramatically while increasing transmission.

Another branch of non-wavelength-selective photovoltaics utilize visibly absorbing thin-film semi-conductors with small thicknesses or large enough band gaps that allow light to pass through. This results in semi-transparent photovoltaics with a similar direct trade off between efficiency and transmission as spatially segmented opaque solar cells.

==== Wavelength-selective ====
Wavelength-selective photovoltaics achieve transparency by utilizing materials that only absorb UV and/or NIR light and were first demonstrated in 2011. Despite their higher transmissions, lower power conversion efficiencies have resulted due to a variety of challenges. These include small exciton diffusion lengths, scaling of transparent electrodes without jeopardizing efficiency, and general lifetime due to the volatility of organic materials used in TPVs in general.

=== Innovations in transparent and translucent photovoltaics ===
Early attempts at developing non-wavelength-selective semi-transparent organic photovoltaics using very thin active layers that absorbed in the visible spectrum were only able to achieve efficiencies below 1%. However in 2011, transparent organic photovoltaics that utilized an organic chloroaluminum phthalocyanine (ClAlPc) donor and a fullerene acceptor exhibited absorption in the ultraviolet and near-infrared (NIR) spectrum with efficiencies around 1.3% and visible light transmission of over 65%. In 2017, MIT researchers developed a process to successfully deposit transparent graphene electrodes onto organic solar cells resulting in a 61% transmission of visible light and improved efficiencies ranging from 2.8%-4.1%.

Perovskite solar cells, popular due to their promise as next-generation photovoltaics with efficiencies over 25%, have also shown promise as translucent photovoltaics. In 2015, a semitransparent perovskite solar cell using a methylammonium lead triiodide perovskite and a silver nanowire mesh top electrode demonstrated 79% transmission at an 800 nm wavelength and efficiencies at around 12.7%.

== Government subsidies ==
In some countries, additional incentives, or subsidies, are offered for building-integrated photovoltaics in addition to the existing feed-in tariffs for stand-alone solar systems. Since July 2006 France offered the highest incentive for BIPV, equal to an extra premium of EUR 0.25/kWh paid in addition to the 30 Euro cents for PV systems. These incentives are offered in the form of a rate paid for electricity fed to the grid.

=== Europe ===
- France €0.25/kWh
- Germany €0.05/kWh façade bonus expired in 2009
- Italy €0.04–€0.09/kWh
- United Kingdom 4.18 p/kWh
- Spain, compared with a non- building installation that receives €0.28/kWh (RD 1578/2008):
  - ≤20 kW: €0.34/kWh
  - >20 kW: €0.31/kWh

=== United States ===
- United States – Varies by state. Check Database of State Incentives for Renewables & Efficiency for more details.

=== China ===
Further to the announcement of a subsidy program for BIPV projects in March 2009 offering RMB20 per watt for BIPV systems and RMB15/watt for rooftop systems, the Chinese government recently unveiled a photovoltaic energy subsidy program "the Golden Sun Demonstration Project". The subsidy program aims at supporting the development of photovoltaic electricity generation ventures and the commercialization of PV technology. The Ministry of Finance, the Ministry of Science and Technology and the National Energy Bureau have jointly announced the details of the program in July 2009. Qualified on-grid photovoltaic electricity generation projects including rooftop, BIPV, and ground mounted systems are entitled to receive a subsidy equal to 50% of the total investment of each project, including associated transmission infrastructure. Qualified off-grid independent projects in remote areas will be eligible for subsidies of up to 70% of the total investment. In mid November, China's finance ministry has selected 294 projects totaling 642 megawatts that come to roughly RMB 20 billion ($3 billion) in costs for its subsidy plan to dramatically boost the country's solar energy production.

== Other integrated photovoltaics ==
Vehicle-integrated photovoltaics (ViPV) are similar for vehicles. Solar cells could be embedded into panels exposed to sunlight such as the hood, roof and possibly the trunk depending on a car's design.

== Challenges ==
=== Performance ===
Because BIPV systems generate on-site power and are integrated into the building envelope, the system's output power and thermal properties are the two primary performance indicators. Conventional BIPV systems have a lower heat dissipation capability than rack-mounted PV, which results in BIPV modules experiencing higher operating temperatures. Higher temperatures may degrade the module's semiconducting material, decreasing the output efficiency and precipitating early failure. In addition, the efficiency of BIPV systems is sensitive to weather conditions, and the use of inappropriate BIPV systems may also reduce their energy output efficiency. In terms of thermal performance, BIPV windows can reduce the cooling load compared to conventional clear glass windows, but may increase the heating load of the building.

Building-integrated photovoltaics (BIPV) are solar power technologies that are integrated into the building system, replacing conventional building materials such as roofing, windows, or facades. BIPVs generate electricity while contributing to the building's structural and aesthetic functions. This integration allows for energy production in urban environments where space for traditional solar panel mounting is limited, offering an innovative solution for sustainable urban development.

The performance of BIPV systems is contingent on various factors, including location, orientation, and the type of photovoltaic materials used. But a significant challenge lies in ensuring that the BIPV system provides optimal energy output while maintaining the aesthetic and architectural integrity of the building. Studies have shown that the performance of BIPV can vary depending on the choice of materials (e.g., crystalline silicon, thin-film, or organic photovoltaics), with silicon-based modules generally offering higher efficiency.

Long-term degradation is a very important concern for BIPV systems. Over time, BIPV systems may experience reduced efficiency due to various environmental factors such as temperature fluctuations, humidity, and exposure to pollutants or even decaying organic matter or compounds. Research suggests that BIPVs embedded in building facades are more susceptible to weathering, which may lead to a reduction in performance compared to traditional rooftop systems. This study is gradually being proven as e-commerce platforms like Amazon and Alibaba are making BIPV more accessible to people across various regions. Materials such as organic photovoltaics are more flexible and can face higher rates of degradation and reduced longevity, limiting their widespread adoption in BIPV applications.

The cleaning and maintenance of BIPVs also present unique challenges. The integration of photovoltaic materials into building surfaces often complicates the cleaning process. For instance, traditional cleaning methods or chemicals used for conventional solar panels might not be applicable due to the embedded nature of BIPV systems. In addition, the accumulation of dirt, dust, and other debris can significantly reduce the energy efficiency of the system. In urban areas, where air pollution and particulate matter are prevalent, the cleaning frequency may increase, leading to higher maintenance costs. Due to efforts to ensure optimal performance, regular monitoring and customised cleaning protocols are essential. Advances in self-cleaning technologies and the development of dirt-repellent coatings are being explored to mitigate these issues.

=== Cost ===
The high upfront investment in BIPV systems is one of the biggest barriers to implementation. In addition to the upfront cost of purchasing BIPV components, the highly integrated nature of BIPV systems increases the complexity of the building design, which in turn leads to increased design and construction costs. Also, insufficient and inexperienced practitioners lead to higher employment costs incurred in the development of BIPV projects.

=== Policy and regulation ===
Although many countries have support policies for PV, most do not have additional benefits for BIPV systems. And typically, BIPV systems need to comply with building and PV industry standards, which places higher demands on implementing BIPV systems. In addition, government policies of lower conventional energy prices will lead to lower BIPV system benefits, which is particularly evident in countries where the price of conventional electricity is very low or subsidized by governments, such as in GCC countries.

=== Public understanding ===
Studies show that public awareness of BIPV is limited and the cost is generally considered too high. Deepening public understanding of BIPV through various public channels (e.g., policy, community engagement, and demonstration buildings) is likely to be beneficial to its long-term development.

== See also ==
- Distributed generation
- List of pioneering solar buildings
- Microgeneration
- Passive solar building design
- Perovskite solar cell
- Photovoltaic module
- Rooftop solar power
- Roof tile
- Smart glass, a type of window blind capable of conserving energy for cooling
- Solar cell
- Solar power
- Solar shingle
- Solar thermal
- Zero-energy building
