= Solar shingle =

Type of solar panel

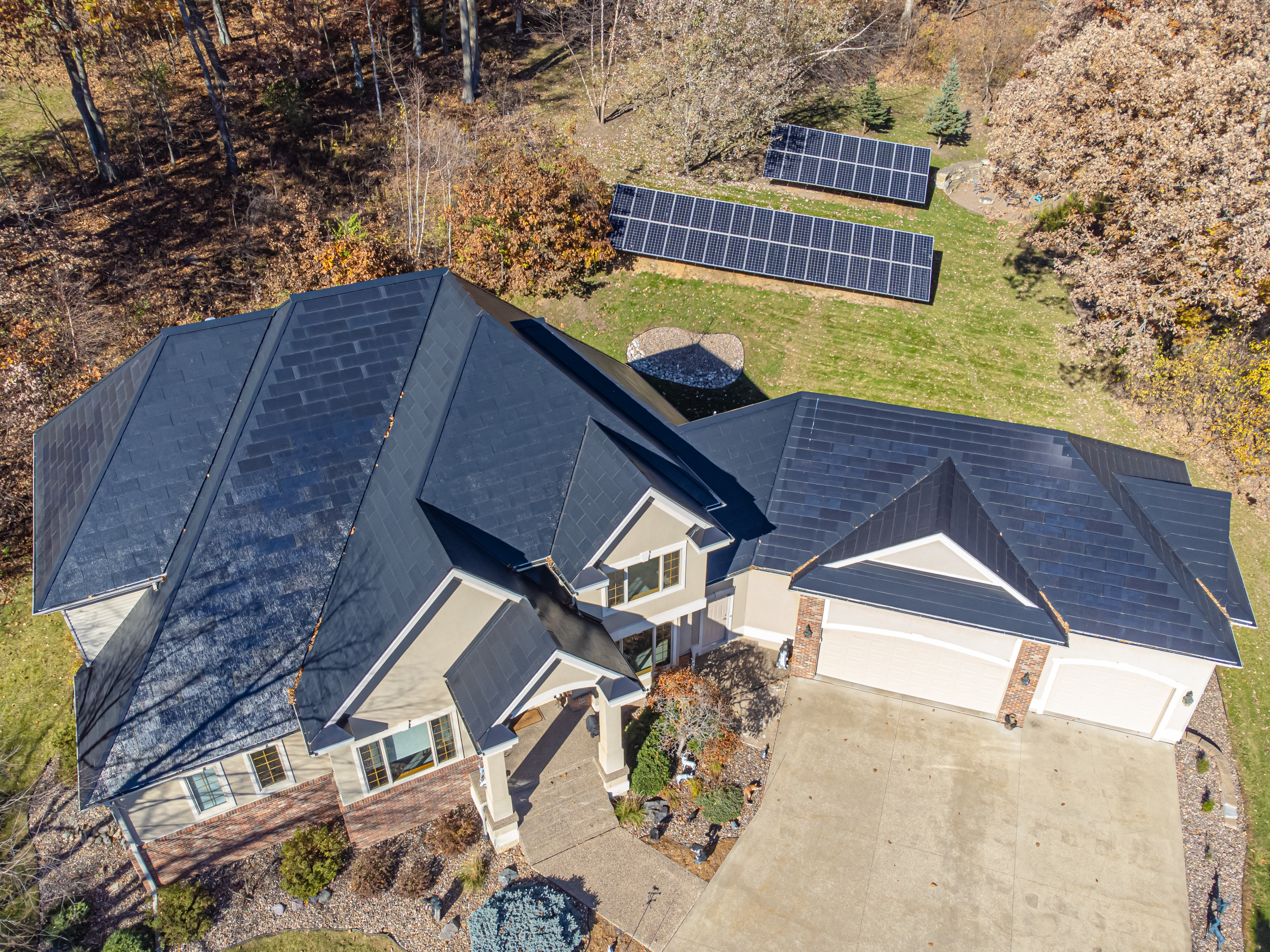
Tesla Solar Roof

Solar shingles, also called photovoltaic shingles, are solar panels designed to look like and function as conventional roofing materials, such as asphalt shingle or slate, while also producing electricity. Solar shingles are a type of solar energy solution known as building-integrated photovoltaics (BIPV).

There are several varieties of solar shingles, including shingle-sized solid panels that take the place of a number of conventional shingles in a strip, semi-rigid designs containing several silicon solar cells that are sized more like conventional shingles, and newer systems using various thin-film solar cell technologies that match conventional shingles both in size and flexibility. There are also products using a more traditional number of silicon solar cells per panel reaching as much as 100 watts DC rating per shingle.

Solar shingles are manufactured by several companies.

== History ==
Solar shingles became commercially available in 2005. In a 2009 interview with Reuters, a spokesperson for the Dow Chemical Company estimated that their entry into the solar shingle market would generate $5 billion in revenue by 2015 and $10 billion by 2020. Dow solar shingles, known as the POWERHOUSE Solar System, first became available in Colorado, in October 2011. A 3rd generation of POWERHOUSE Solar System was exclusively licensed to RGS Energy for commercialization from 2017 until 2020, when RGS Energy filed for bankruptcy.

In October 2016, Tesla entered the solar shingle space in a joint venture with SolarCity. Tesla later acquired SolarCity and the solar shingle product was described as "a flop" in 2019. Solar marketplace provider EnergySage reviewed the now named Tesla Solar Roof, noting that it had "experienced significant setbacks that have delayed its design, production, and deployment."

In January 2022, GAF Materials Corporation announced they would start selling a solar shingle product.

== Description ==
Solar shingles are photovoltaic modules, capturing sunlight and transforming it into electricity. Most solar shingles are 12 in × 86 in (300 mm × 2,180 mm) and can be stapled directly to the roofing cloth. When applied they have a 5 in × 86 in (130 mm × 2,180 mm) strip of exposed surface. Different models of shingles have different mounting requirements. Some can be applied directly onto roofing felt intermixed with regular asphalt shingles while others may need special installation.

Some early manufacturers used solar thin-film technologies such as CIGS to produce electricity, which are less common in the solar industry than silicon-based cells. Current manufacturers, such as RGS Energy, CertainTeed, and SunTegra, have chosen to use the industry-standard monocrystalline or polycrystalline silicon solar cells in their POWERHOUSE 3.0, Apollo II, and SunTegra Shingle, respectively. The installation methods for some solar shingle solutions can be easier than traditional panel installations because they avoid the need to locate rafters and install with a process much more similar to asphalt shingles than standard solar panels. Other solar shingles, such as the Tesla Solar Roof, are much more difficult and expensive to install, requiring the removal and replacement of the existing roof.

Solar shingled roofs tend to have a deep, dark, purplish-blue or black color, and therefore look similar to other roofs in most situations. Home owners may prefer solar shingles because large solar panels can be highly visible and spoil the aesthetics of the house.

== Cost ==
The cost of solar shingles can range from $3.80 per watt up to $9.00 per watt installed depending on the manufacturer, technology used, and system size. As of May 2019, the average cost of a traditional, roof-mounted residential solar panel installation in the United States was just above $3.00 per watt, according to the Solar Energy Industry Association. While solar shingles are typically more expensive to install than traditional solar panels, some companies in recent years since 2014 have made strides to lessen the gap between the installed cost of going solar with panels versus going solar with shingles.

According to Dow Chemical Company reports, a typical residential install consisting of 350 solar shingles can cost at least $20,000; however, federal and state incentives depending on the location might significantly bring down the cost.

Solar contractors typically offer homeowners a full-service price for solar installation, which includes equipment purchasing, permit preparation and filing, registration with the local utility company, workmanship warranties, and complete on-site installation. Because photovoltaic solutions produce power in the form of direct current (DC) and the standard in homes is alternating current (AC), all grid-connected solar installations include an inverter to convert DC to AC.

== See also ==
- Building-integrated photovoltaics
- Energy development
- Green technology
- Solar energy
- Thin film solar on metal roofs
