= SolarCity =

American solar energy company

SolarCity Corporation

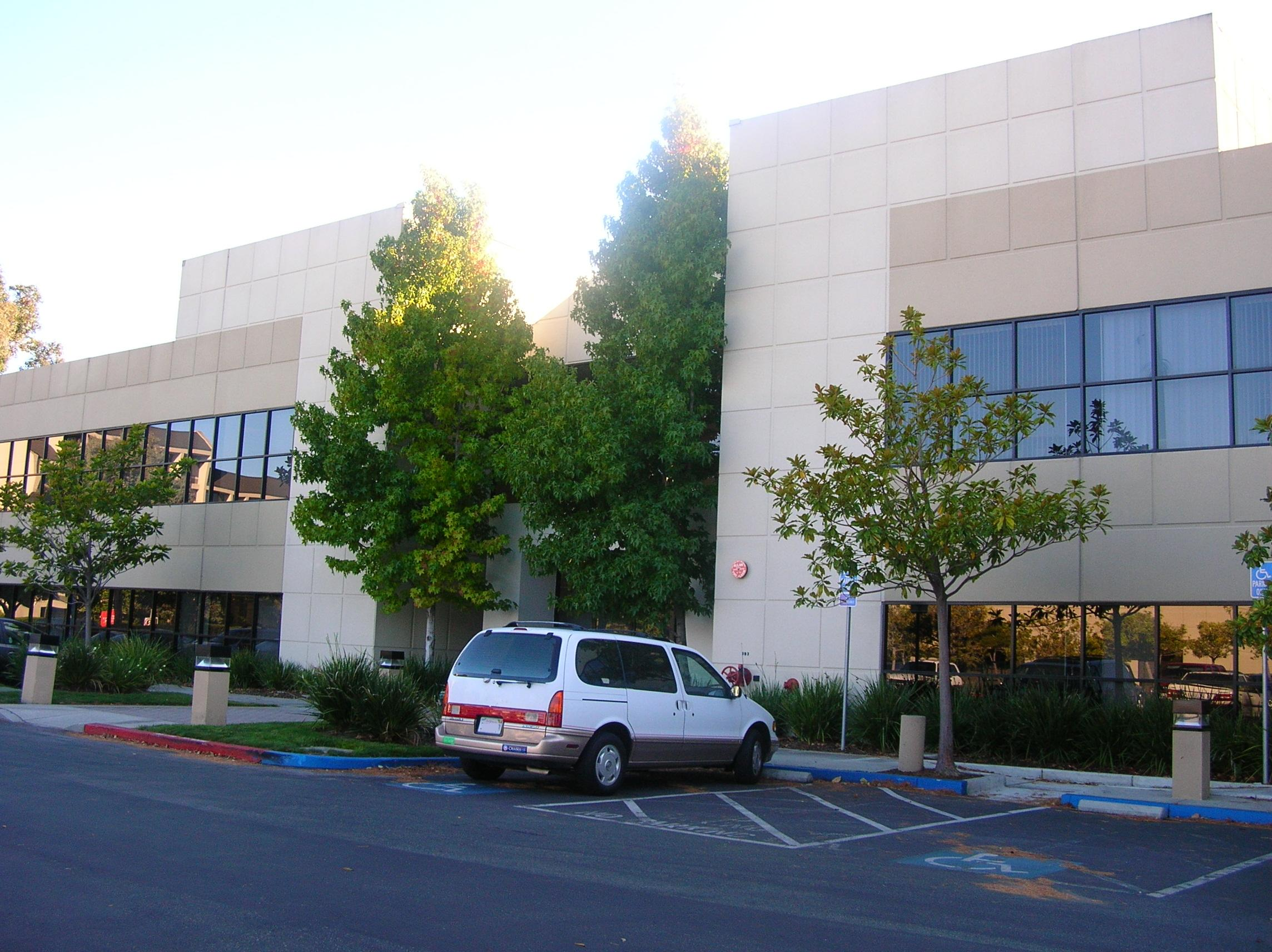
- Original SolarCity headquarters in Foster City, California
- Type: Public
- Traded as: Nasdaq: SCTY (2012–2016)
- Industry: Solar energy generation
- Founded: July 4, 2006; 20 years ago
- Founders: Lyndon and Peter Rive
- Defunct: November 21, 2016
- Fate: Acquired by Tesla, Inc.
- Successor: Tesla Energy
- Headquarters: Fremont, California, United States
- Key people: Lyndon Rive (CEO); Peter Rive (CTO); Elon Musk (Chairman)
- Website: solarcity.com (defunct)

SolarCity Corporation was a publicly traded company headquartered in Fremont, California, that sold and installed solar energy generation systems as well as other related products and services to residential, commercial, and industrial customers. The company was founded on July 4, 2006, by Peter and Lyndon Rive, the cousins of SpaceX and Tesla CEO Elon Musk. Tesla acquired SolarCity in 2016, at a cost of approximately $2.6 billion (equivalent to $3.5 billion in 2025) and reorganized its solar business into Tesla Energy.

SolarCity heavily focused on door-to-door sales of leased systems, where customers would pay no upfront costs, but agreed to purchase the power generated by those panels from the company for 20 years. The business model became the most popular in the US and made the company the largest residential solar installer, but it caused SolarCity to have over $1.5 billion in debt by the time of its acquisition in 2016 (equivalent to $2 billion in 2025).

Prior to its acquisition by Tesla, the two companies had a co-marketing relationship, announced in the 2006 first Tesla master plan. Tesla CEO Elon Musk served as the chairman of SolarCity, SolarCity offered free charging to Tesla Roadster owners at its charging stations, and SolarCity became one of the first installers of the Tesla Powerwall home energy storage battery.

== History ==
SolarCity was founded in 2006 by South African brothers Peter and Lyndon Rive, based on a suggestion for a solar company concept by their cousin, Elon Musk, who was the chairman and helped start the company. By 2009, solar panels it had installed were capable of generating 440 megawatts (MW) of power. In 2011, the company launched their expansion to the East Coast with the acquisition of the solar division of Clean Currents and groSolar. Following the acquisitions, SolarCity expanded operations on the East Coast and opened in Connecticut, Pennsylvania, South Carolina, Florida, Vermont, and New Hampshire.

In 2013, SolarCity was the leading residential solar installer in the U.S. Solar Power World magazine listed it as the number two overall solar installation company in the U.S. In 2013, SolarCity purchased Paramount Solar from Paramount Equity for $120 million. By 2015, its installed panels were capable of generating 870 MW of solar power and accounted for approximately 28% of non-utility solar installations in the U.S. that year. In October 2014, SolarCity announced it would be offering up to $200 million in solar bonds in its first registered public offering of bonds in the United States. In March 2016, SpaceX bought $90 million of SolarCity stock.

In net metering in Nevada case in late 2015, SolarCity withdrew from solar sales and installation in Nevada, following the decision by the state's Public Utilities Commission (PUC) to raise the monthly service charge for rooftop solar customers and progressively reduce the return on solar energy sold back into the grid under the net metering rule. Under the new rules, the monthly service charge imposed on Nevada Power's rooftop solar-generating customers rose from $12.75 to $17.90 and was scheduled to rise to $38.51 by January 1, 2020; simultaneously, the rates given to rooftop solar generating customers for their surplus solar energy were also clawed back and were to continue to decline over the ensuing four years. As a result, SolarCity eliminated more than 550 jobs in Nevada.

=== Workforce reduction ===
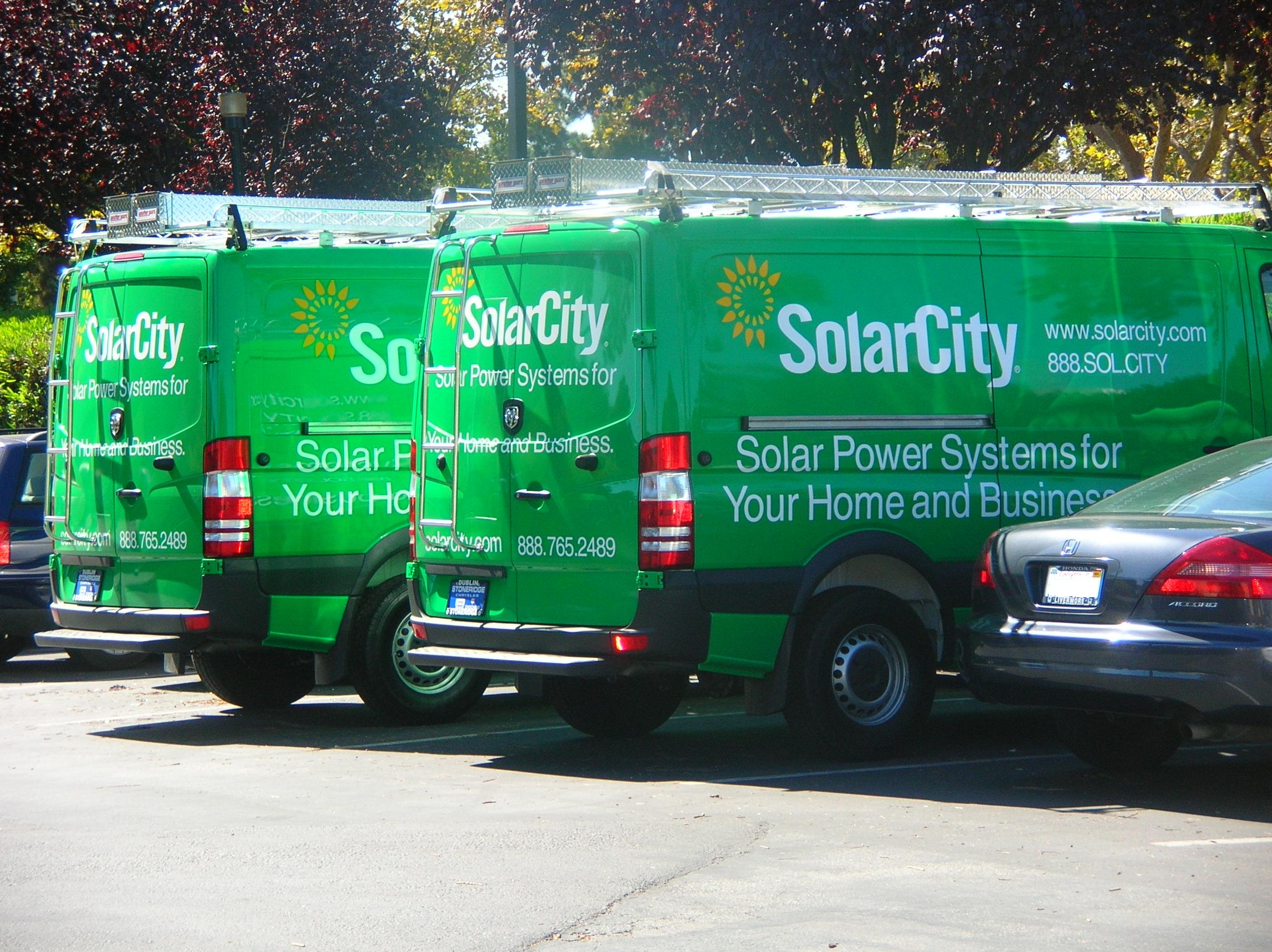
SolarCity installation vehicles

During 2015, the number of employees had grown by 69%; at the end of 2015, SolarCity had 15,273 employees. To preserve cash, SolarCity eliminated 20% of its total workforce in 2016, ending 2016 with 12,243 employees. This was the first time in the company's history that it cut its workforce.

The job cuts affected workers across the entire company: 22% of jobs were cut in operations, installations, and manufacturing; and 27% in sales and marketing. In August 2016, the company announced that it planned to take up to $5 million in charges to cover its planned layoffs. The company also cut the salaries of its two co-founders from $275,000 to $1 per year.

=== Acquisition by Tesla, Inc. ===
On August 1, 2016, Tesla announced that it would be acquiring the company in an all-stock $2.6 billion transaction as Tesla's mission since its inception has been "to accelerate the world's transition to sustainable energy." As part of Elon Musk's "The Secret Tesla Motors Master Plan," Tesla sought to expedite the world's move from a mine-and-burn hydrocarbon economy towards a solar electric economy. The proposal for acquisition was approved by antitrust regulators.

More than 85% of unaffiliated shareholders (affiliated shareholders are those who hold executive positions at either company) from Tesla and SolarCity voted to approve the acquisition on November 17, 2016, allowing the acquisition to close on November 21, 2016. Some investors criticized the deal, calling it "a misguided effort to rescue two companies that depend on investors and the government for operating cash." In April 2022, a Delaware court ruled in favor of defendant Elon Musk in a shareholder lawsuit over Tesla's $2.6 billion acquisition of SolarCity. “[The] Tesla Board meaningfully vetted the Acquisition, and Elon did not stand in its way,” read the opinion by Vice Chancellor Joseph Slights. “Equally if not more important, the preponderance of the evidence reveals that Tesla paid a fair price—SolarCity was, at a minimum, worth what Tesla paid for it,” Slights added. The court also noted that since the acquisition "Tesla’s value has massively increased". On June 6, 2023, the Delaware Supreme Court upheld the ruling, ending the litigation.

In April 2017, the chief policy officer of SolarCity, Jon Wellinghoff, left SolarCity. In May 2017, Lyndon Rive announced he would leave SolarCity, and Peter Rive left shortly thereafter. By 2019, Tesla's solar panel market share was falling, prompting the company to cut its sales force. Revenue from Tesla's energy generation and storage operations from January to September 2019 fell 7% from a year earlier to $1.1 billion.

== Products and services ==
=== Solar leasing ===
In 2008, SolarCity entered the solar leasing market with a new solar lease option for homeowners: leasing rooftop solar to customers who would pay no upfront costs. In exchange, customers paid for 20 years for power generated by those panels. SolarCity's solar lease allowed some homeowners to pay less each month than they previously paid for electricity from the utility company. The "no-money-down solar" business model became the most popular in the U.S. and increased installations, but it also added considerably to SolarCity's debt, accounting for about half of the company's over $3 billion debt in 2016. The business model was also criticized by consumer advocates and government regulators.

=== Commercial solar panels ===
In May 2008, SolarCity completed what was, at the time, the largest commercial solar installation in San Jose, California, at the North Campus of eBay. In July 2008, SolarCity completed what was, at the time, the largest commercial solar installation in San Francisco, California, consisting of 1,606 solar photovoltaic panels for British Motor Car Distributors. SolarCity introduced additional financing options for businesses in 2009 and built multiple solar projects for other large organizations, including Walmart, Intel, and the U.S. military. In 2013, the company established GivePower as a non-profit branch of its solar business, which is an independent enterprise.

=== Installation technology ===
SolarCity used proprietary mounting hardware that "snaps together" on rooftops eliminating the need for rails and utilized skirts to hide the hardware and panel edges. SolarCity acquired the mounting technology when it purchased Zep Solar in 2013. The "railless" system allowed installers to install solar panels on the roof more quickly than other installation approaches. Traditionally, solar panel installation had required workers to first outfit roofs with mounting rails and then attach solar panels to those rails.

=== Energy efficiency evaluations and retrofits ===
In 2010, SolarCity acquired Building Solutions, a home energy audit firm and began to offer energy efficiency evaluations and upgrades. SolarCity expanded its energy efficiency services to the East Coast and worked with Admiral's Bank of Boston in March 2012 to make a new loan available to finance energy efficiency improvements.

=== Electric vehicle chargers ===
In 2009, SolarCity entered the electric car charging business by buying the SolSource Energy business of Clean Fuel Connections, Inc. In 2009, SolarCity announced a partnership with Rabobank to make electric car charging available for free to owners of Tesla Roadster cars traveling on U.S. Route 101 in California between San Francisco and Los Angeles. However, in 2012, Tesla independently started deploying their own Supercharger stations.

=== SolarStrong project ===
SolarStrong was SolarCity's five-year plan to build more than $1 billion in solar photovoltaic projects for privatized military housing communities across the United States. It was announced in late 2011.

SolarStrong was carried out by SolarCity in cooperation with Lendlease involving 124 military bases in 33 states. The financing included Bank of America Merrill Lynch, USRG Renewable Finance, and U.S. Bancorp. It had a partial $344 million federal loan guarantee through the U.S. Department of Energy Financial Institution Partnership Program; however, the guarantee was withdrawn after the project implementation started. The project started in 2011 with development of the Joint Base Pearl Harbor–Hickam in Hawaii, followed by Davis–Monthan Air Force Base in Arizona. In 2012, the project continued with the Los Angeles Air Force Base in California, and Peterson Air Force Base, and Schriever Air Force Base in Colorado.

=== Energy storage ===
In 2016, SolarCity ran a pilot project to test a grid backup resource by installing GridLogic software and 10-kilowatt-hour Tesla Powerwall battery packs in 500 California homes. This concept was also tested in Vermont.

== Giga New York ==
In 2014, SolarCity announced plans to build a new manufacturing facility (now known as Giga New York) in Buffalo, New York, in coordination with the SUNY Polytechnic Institute, after acquiring Silevo, a maker of high-efficiency solar modules. The initial manufacturing complex would be a 1.2-million-square-foot (110,000 m^{2}) facility that would cost $900 million and employ 1,500 workers in Buffalo and 5,000 statewide. With a planned capacity of one gigawatt of solar panels annually by 2019, the new plant would be the largest solar plant in the U.S. Groundbreaking for the project occurred in September 2014 with a target completion date of early 2016.

The facility would be the largest of its kind in the Western Hemisphere. Panasonic was to handle production at the Buffalo plant, investing $256 million. Panasonic and SolarCity/Silevo were developing similar but somewhat different HIT-technology, and Panasonic hoped to use SolarCity's 6-inch (150 mm) wafers combining the two companies' technologies at an efficiency of 22%. SolarCity expected demand to outstrip the Buffalo production of 10,000 solar panels per day and bought solar equipment from other manufacturers until more factories could be built. SolarCity was required to spend $5 billion over the next decade on the facility and create more than 1,460 direct manufacturing jobs.

In February 2016, CEO Lyndon Rive announced that due to delays incurred in the supply of machinery for the plant, production would begin in summer 2017. New York State owns the building and most of the equipment, leasing it to SolarCity. Most of the work was completed by November 2016, when the Buffalo Billion project was under investigation, delaying state payments to contractors, but not influencing progress on completion of construction. SolarCity started hiring for the facility in December 2016.

Elon Musk announced in 2017 that production of Tesla's solar roof products would be moved to the Buffalo facility at the end of 2017. It was reported that as of August 2017, production of solar roof tiles had begun at the facility, and Tesla expected to continue to ramp up production through the rest of the year. By the end of 2018, the facility employed about 800 workers. The state of New York required the company to employ at least 1,460 workers at the facility by April 2020 or face a $41.2 million penalty, and in February 2020, the company reported having 1,500 workers at the facility. Panasonic announced that they would cease operations at the facility in May 2020.

== Lawsuits and investigations ==
=== Buffalo Billion ===
Buffalo Billion is a billion-dollar program launched by the administration of New York Governor Andrew Cuomo to revitalize Buffalo, New York. One of the main features of the program was the solar panel factory to be leased by SolarCity in the High-Tech Manufacturing Innovation Hub at RiverBend. The state appropriated $750 million in funding for the hub. According to Daily Energy Insider, "The facility will have one gigawatt of annual solar capacity when it reaches full production and is expected to produce about 10,000 solar panels per day."

On April 29, 2016, U.S. Attorney Preet Bharara (Southern District of New York) began an investigation into state construction projects and contracts, including the Buffalo Billion. SolarCity was not the subject or focus of the investigation and was not involved in the vendor selection or contracting. SolarCity said that it was cooperating with federal agents who had been in contact with the company. According to The New York Times, Buffalo Billion would benefit "a tangle of well-connected players – including developers and frequent donors to the governor–who have feasted on Buffalo Billion money". Cuomo stringently defended the project, noting that there had been a decrease in unemployment and an increase in spending around the Buffalo area.

Three executives who worked for LPCiminelli Development faced a 14-count indictment for wire fraud and bribery and alleged bid rigging of the SolarCity RiverBend construction contract. Additionally, five other people have been charged with related crimes. On May 18, 2016, the Public Authorities Control Board delayed a meeting at which it was set to approve $485 million in new funds for SolarCity. The New York state legislature planned to approve a budget in April 2017 that would give $500 million more into the Buffalo Billion program. In return, the legislature wanted the Cuomo administration to put more transparency into how the money is spent.

=== Oregon Attorney General investigation ===
On March 30, 2017, The Oregonian said that Campaign for Accountability, a D.C.-based consumer advocacy group, and other groups have asked Oregon Attorney General Ellen Rosenblum to investigate solar panel sales practices that "are designed to trick homeowners into buying or leasing solar panels" in violation of Oregon's Unlawful Trade Practices Act. According to The Oregonian, the request to Rosenblum "singled out one company: California-based SolarCity. It outlined several complaints filed against the solar giant by Oregonians who claimed they'd been misled about costs, tax credits and energy savings by the company."

The Campaign for Accountability reviewed 58 complaints that consumers filed with the Oregon Department of Justice and said that the complaints indicated "a widespread pattern of apparent fraud and abuse by solar companies." The Oregon Solar Energy Industry Association, however, said that it examined the complaints and "found the numbers to be relatively low – lower than those being cited by the Campaign for Accountability." Investigators determined that SolarCity attempted to "cheat the system" by inflating the cost of 14 commercial solar projects by more than 100% to qualify for higher state tax credits. SolarCity and its accountant were required to pay back $13 million to the state of Oregon. The investigation also found that "phony and misleading documents" were submitted for some projects, and there was a bribery scheme involving the projects' energy consultant and a state Energy Department manager. One of SolarCity's solar panel suppliers employed prisoners at the Federal Correctional Institution in Sheridan, Oregon, to keep costs down.

=== "Solar by Degree" project ===
The company was involved in a case concerning Martin Shain, the lead energy consultant in a solar power project at two Oregon universities. Shain was indicted for forgery in Marion County in August 2016. He is a consultant for BacGen Technologies in Seattle, a key player in the controversial $24 million "Solar by Degree" project and is accused of "creating a phony invoice from a fictional subcontractor that was pivotal in getting nearly $12 million in tax credits from the Oregon Department of Energy". The project began in 2013 and was sponsored by the Oregon University System; thousands of solar panels, generating millions of kilowatt hours of energy per year, were constructed on 21 acres on the campuses of Oregon State University in Corvallis and the Oregon Institute of Technology in Klamath Falls.

The state's case revolves around two documents, which include an invoice from Solar Foundations Systems dated February 25, 2011, and a December 2011 letter signed by Ryan Davies, the former head of RedCo, a Utah-based company, which was the second developer on the project. According to KOIN-TV, "The Davies letter reported $210,000 had been spent toward the project and that construction was progressing." The Solar Foundations invoice contains details of the construction of solar arrays. The invoice was necessary to provide proof of work on the project to get tax credits from the state. The "Solar by Degree" project received the tax credits, but it was later shown that the company named on the invoice, Solar Foundations, does not exist. In addition, Davies claims he did not write nor has ever seen the RedCo letter in question and that his name was forged. Relying on this evidence, the state claims Shain forged both documents. Shain denies forging the invoice and claims it was given to him by someone else involved in the project. The tax credits involved were given to SolarCity, the third developer in the project, along with its financial backers. According to The Oregonian, "Those backers provide upfront financing for the projects in exchange for a share of the project revenues and the federal and state tax credits, which they can use to offset their own taxes." SolarCity said, "We financed and constructed the projects in accord with the requirements of the Oregon Department of Energy." The company argues that the state hired Shain, and it had no knowledge of the phony documents in question; otherwise, it would have not pursued the endeavor.

=== Treasury Department inquiries ===
In 2012, the Treasury Department began investigative interviews of solar firms regarding their fair market value calculations for constructed solar energy systems. SolarCity stated that its values were correct and complied with the Treasury Department guidelines. SolarCity received roughly $501.2 million in credits up until December 31, 2015. In 2017, SolarCity settled the investigation by agreeing to pay $29.5 million without any admission of guilt or liability.

=== Customer litigation ===
SolarCity lowered the minimum FICO score required for customers to get the leasing deals, using the score of 650 (a "fair" credit rating) as the cutoff. However, between 2014 and 2017, SolarCity signed long-term lease agreements with at least 14 homeowner customers right before the customers defaulted on their mortgages. The company was named in 139 lawsuits where it is the defendant in legal proceedings based on "residential foreclosure action."

In its response, SolarCity said in a statement to the New York Times, "Out of more than 305,000 installed customers, SolarCity is currently involved in 139 such proceedings. The litigation is not adversarial – being named in the foreclosure proceeding provides us with advance notice that we need to reassign a contract, and many are immediately resolved with the relevant bank."

=== Customer cancellation investigation ===
The Securities and Exchange Commission (SEC) began investigating Sunrun and SolarCity in May 2017 and were looking into whether they adequately disclosed canceled contracts. "Some customers say they canceled contracts after being strong-armed into solar-energy deals" and there have been hundreds of complaints to state attorneys general.

The federal government is investigating whether solar companies are "masking how many customers they are losing." The SEC is involved because "investors use that cancellation metric as one way to gauge the companies' health." According to the Wall Street Journal, "To generate business, solar companies have long relied on thousands of salespeople who knock on doors, make hundreds of cold calls and even trail people as they shop at retailers like Home Depot Inc., according to salespeople, executives and homeowners."

=== FCC receiving radio interference complaints ===
SolarCity installed SolarEdge inverter systems with a type of DC-DC converter called an optimizer. These systems cause radio interference as documented in April 2016 QST magazine a publication of the ARRL.

=== Vermont projects without approval ===
In June 2017, the Vermont Public Service Board discovered that SolarCity was implementing solar projects in Vermont without approval required by law. According to Vermont Public, Public Service Board Chair Anthony Roisman sent a letter to SolarCity warning the company that it needed to get regulatory approval before installing solar generation equipment and attaching it to the state's electrical grid. Roisman wrote, "Over the past few months, my office has observed a pattern of procedural issues with net-metering applications being pursued by your company." Officials at the company worked quickly to respond to the issue.

=== Allegations of faked sales numbers ===
In July 2018, three former employees filed a lawsuit against SolarCity, alleging that the corporation had approved the creation of "fake sales accounts", which resulted in an "unreasonably high valuation of SolarCity" for investors. After allegedly informing management, including CEO Elon Musk, of these incidents, the employees were allegedly fired, which they argue contravenes California's whistleblower protection laws. A Tesla spokesman denied these allegations. On June 5, 2020, the case was dismissed with prejudice.

=== Walmart lawsuit and Project Titan ===
SolarCity installed and manages solar panels on the roofs of more than 240 Walmart stores. On August 21, 2019, Walmart filed a lawsuit against Tesla, seeking reimbursement for millions of dollars in damages and release from contracts, claiming that fires on the roofs of seven of those stores since 2012 were caused by SolarCity's "negligent installation and maintenance." The suit was settled on November 5, 2019, and the terms were not disclosed. A joint statement provided by Tesla stated the companies said they were "pleased to have resolved the issues raised by Walmart" concerning the installations, and looked forward to "a safe re-energization of our sustainable energy systems." Walmart had accused Tesla of "widespread, systematic negligence" and ignoring prudent industry practices by relying on untrained and unsupervised personnel to install and maintain its panels, and prioritizing speed and profit over safety.

At around the start of the lawsuit, it was revealed that Tesla had initiated a secretive program, called Project Titan, to "replace solar-panel parts that could cause fires" as early as the previous summer. From a resource perspective, Project Titan involved "ordering supplies including ladders and tool belts and sent crews out around the United States" to approximately 50 cities as well as replacements for the specific parts believed to be causing fires: Amphenol H4 connectors and SolarEdge optimizers.

== The Checks and Balances Project ==
SolarCity indirectly funds a political advocacy group known as the Checks and Balances Project. The project has criticized the elected members of the Arizona Corporation Commission (the regulatory body that oversees electricity and utilities in Arizona) for being too well-connected to utility companies. The Checks and Balances Project has filed several requests for public records from the Arizona Corporation Commission. In July 2016, the Federal Bureau of Investigation interviewed the head of Checks and Balances as part of a larger criminal investigation into the financing of certain Arizona statewide races in 2014.

== Project financing and the Google Fund ==
SolarCity partnered with banks, large corporations, and the asset-backed market to create project finance funds to finance its lease and power purchase agreement (PPA) options. Among SolarCity's better-known financing partnerships was a $280 million fund created with Google to finance residential solar installations in June 2011. The Google Fund was the largest fund of its kind in the U.S., and Google's largest investment in clean energy.

== Trade organization and collaboration ==
The company is one of the founding members of The Alliance for Solar Choice, or TASC, which is a rooftop photovoltaic power station solar trade organization.

=== Government-funded collaboration ===
The SunShot Initiative is a national effort to support solar energy adoption to make solar energy affordable for all Americans. It is run by the US Department of Energy's Solar Energy Technologies Office and funds research, development, demonstration, and deployment projects. It is a collaboration of private companies, universities, state and local governments, and nonprofits, as well as national laboratories. The program began in 2011 with the initial goal of making solar energy competitive with traditional forms of electricity by 2020. By 2016, the program achieved 70% of the progress towards the 2020 goal.

In the fiscal year 2012 Congressional budget, the program was appropriated $457 million. According to the U.S. Department of Energy's appropriation request for that year, "The program also encourages Systems Integration by developing radically new approaches to reduce the cost and improve reliability and functionality of power electronics and supporting industry development through test and evaluation standards, and tools for understanding grid integration issues."

SolarCity was involved in a collaboration with the program along with the Energy Department's National Renewable Energy Laboratory and Hawaiian Electric Industries. Using government and taxpayer funds, SolarCity helped 2,500 Hawaii residential customers connect their solar power systems to the grid by the end of December 2015.

== See also ==
- Charging station
- Efficient energy use
- List of energy storage projects
