= EnergySage =

American energy comparison company

- Industry: Solar power, comparison solar website
- Founded: 2009; 17 years ago Boston, Massachusetts
- Founder: Vikram Aggarwal, CEO
- Headquarters: Boston, Massachusetts
- Parent: Schneider Electric
- Website: www.energysage.com

EnergySage is an American Boston-based company that operates an online comparison marketplace for clean energy products such as solar, energy storage, and heat pumps. The company's website provides information about clean energy options and shows online quotes from local solar, heat pump, and battery installers for consumer comparison shopping. The company also issues reports and survey results on the state of the clean energy industry regarding pricing, consumer preferences, and trends.

EnergySage has received grants from the U.S. Department of Energy's (DOE) SunShot Initiative and additional funding from the Massachusetts Clean Energy Center (MassCEC), as well as venture capital groups. In 2022, EnergySage was acquired by Schneider Electric and continues to operate independently.

== History ==
EnergySage was founded in 2009 by Vikram Aggarwal. Aggarwal's early goal for the company was to create "a website that would tell consumers the right questions to ask about solar energy." In June 2012, EnergySage was awarded $500,000 from the DOE through the Solar Energy Technologies Office's Incubator program, an early-stage assistance program for startup cleantech companies.

The DOE later awarded EnergySage an additional $1.25 million in October 2013 via the department's SunShot initiative to develop its solar marketplace, and $1.6 million in July 2017. EnergySage announced a $1.5 million Series-A funding round in May 2015 led by Launchpad Venture Group, MassCEC, and other venture capital groups. Later in 2015, the Solar Energy Industries Association selected EnergySage to "make the organization's own solar shopping tool[,] [t]he SEIA EnergySage marketplace."

In 2019, EnergySage introduced a buyer's guide for an independent ratings system for solar panels, batteries, and inverters. The National Renewable Energy Laboratory assisted EnergySage in the early development of the system.

In 2020, conglomerate Schneider Electric invested in EnergySage during the COVID-19 pandemic, and by 2021 the company's separate marketplace for community solar included nine states. In February 2022, Schneider Electric announced that it had acquired EnergySage for an undisclosed amount, with EnergySage continuing to operate independently.

In July 2025, EnergySage pursued an official partnership with the progressive political movement called "Third Act Movement".

== Products and operations ==
=== Solar marketplace and solar calculator ===
Homeowners and businesses use EnergySage's solar marketplace to request and compare solar or solar plus storage quotes from the company's network of local installers. Quotes are standardized with data points such as cost, financing options, equipment quality, etc. The marketplace takes advantage of Google satellite imagery to estimate a property's solar capabilities and covers 41 states and Washington, D.C. Installers are required to compete for business and display their quotes side-by-side and customers can review their options with a company advisor. EnergySage also offers a calculator for property-specific estimates of the costs and advantages of installing solar based on live quotes.

=== Other products ===
EnergySage's community solar marketplace displays community solar projects based on a user's zip code and utility company. After joining a project, customers receive credits for offsetting their energy consumption with solar.

In October 2022, the company launched the EnergySage Heat Pump Marketplace for evaluating heat pump quotes from EnergySage's network of approved companies. The additional marketplace provides similar services to the company's solar marketplace, but focuses on air source heat pumps.

EnergySage regularly publishes reports about the US's larger solar marketplace with the data it collects from its services. The Solar & Storage Marketplace Report, a biannual publication, analyzes millions of transactions for solar panels, inverters, batteries, etc. The company also releases information about the U.S. solar and battery industry based on its surveys of local and national solar installers.

== Awards ==
In 2016, EnergySage and partner National Grid received a GridEdge Award from Greentech Media for its SolarWise Rhode Island project. EnergySage and National Grid were awarded together again for the 2020 Best Practices Award for Consumer Engagement from the Smart Energy Consumer Collaborative.

Aggarwal was named to the Boston Globe's 2016 Game Changer list. In 2017, EnergySage received the Outstanding Venture award from National Renewable Energy Laboratory at the 2017 Industry Growth Forum.
