= Musk family =

South African-Canadian-American family

The Musk family is a family with roots in South Africa, Canada, England, and the United States, whose most famous member is industrialist Elon Musk, the wealthiest person in the world. It also includes his parents Maye Musk, a model and author, and Errol Musk, a mine-owner, businessman and politician; siblings Kimbal Musk and Tosca Musk, and cousin Lyndon Rive. Elon Musk's ex-wives are Justine Musk and Talulah Riley, and he has many children. Maye's father Joshua N. Haldeman was a chiropractor, aviator, and politician who promoted technocracy and South African apartheid.

== Family tree ==
Wyn	Joshua	Cora	Walter
Maye	Errol
Kimbal	Elon	Tosca
Vivian	X Æ A-Xii

== Elon Musk ==
Elon Reeve Musk (/ˈiːlɒn/ ; born June 28, 1971) is an industrialist, futurist, and former United States public official. He is the chief executive officer and largest shareholder of Tesla and SpaceX. Musk has been the wealthiest person in the world since 2025, and became the only trillionaire in history (in terms of US dollars) in 2026; as of November 2026, Forbes estimates his net worth to be $849.7 billion.

Musk was born into the wealthy Musk family in Pretoria, South Africa. He emigrated to Canada in 1989; he has Canadian citizenship as his mother was born there. He received bachelor's degrees in 1997 from the University of Pennsylvania before moving to California, United States, to pursue business ventures. In 1995, he co-founded Zip2, a web software company. Following its sale in 1999, he co-founded X.com, an e-commerce payment system that merged with Confinity in March 2000 to form PayPal. Musk also became an American citizen in 2002.

In 2002, Musk founded and became CEO and chief engineer of SpaceX, a space technology company. Musk joined Tesla as an angel investor in 2004 and became its CEO and product architect in 2008. In 2015, Musk co-founded OpenAI to advance artificial intelligence (AI) research, but later left; his growing discontent with the organization's direction and leadership in the AI boom in the 2020s led him to establish xAI, which became a subsidiary of SpaceX in 2026. In 2022, he acquired Twitter, a social networking service, and made significant changes, including rebranding it as X in 2023. His other businesses include Neuralink, a neurotechnology company that he co-founded in 2016, and the Boring Company, a tunneling company that he founded in 2017. In November 2025, Tesla approved a pay package worth $1 trillion for Musk, which he is to receive over 10 years if certain milestones are met, such as achieving a market capitalization of $8.5 trillion. Musk became the first US-dollar trillionaire upon the initial public offering of SpaceX in June 2026, though a SpaceX stock collapse brought him under the threshold by the next month.

Musk was the largest donor in the 2024 United States presidential election, in which he supported Republican nominee Donald Trump. After Trump's inauguration in January 2025, Musk was a Senior Advisor to President Trump and the de facto head of the Department of Government Efficiency (DOGE). Musk left the Trump administration in May 2025 and returned to managing his companies; shortly thereafter he had a public feud with Trump. Musk also became the largest political donor in American history in 2026, when he supported Republican nominees in the midterm elections.

Musk is a supporter of global far-right politics, figures, and political parties. His political activities, statements and views have made him a polarizing figure. He has been criticized for making unscientific, false, and misleading statements, promoting conspiracy theories, and affirming antisemitic, white nationalist, and transphobic comments. His acquisition of Twitter was controversial because, following his pledge to decrease censorship, there was an increase in hate speech and misinformation on the service. His role in the second Trump administration attracted public backlash, particularly in response to DOGE and its cuts to the US Agency for International Development (USAID) leading to over 780,000 deaths across the globe.

=== Relationships and children ===
According to The Wall Street Journal, Musk has fathered at least fourteen children, one of whom is deceased; the sources close to Musk suggest that the "true number of Musk's children is much higher than publicly known". He met his first wife, Canadian author Justine Wilson, while attending Queen's University in Ontario, Canada; they married in 2000. In 2002, their first child Nevada Musk died of sudden infant death syndrome at the age of 10 weeks. After his death, the couple used in vitro fertilization (IVF) to continue their family; they had twins in 2004, followed by triplets in 2006. The couple divorced in 2008 and had shared custody of their children.

In 2008, Musk began dating English actress Talulah Riley. They married two years later at Dornoch Cathedral in Scotland. In 2012, the couple divorced, before remarrying the following year. After briefly filing for divorce in 2014, Musk finalized a second divorce from Riley in 2016. Musk then dated Amber Heard for several months in 2017; he had reportedly been "pursuing" her since 2012.

In 2018, Musk and Canadian musician Grimes said that they were dating. Grimes gave birth to Musk's seventh child in May 2020. In December 2021, Grimes and Musk had a second child together (Musk's tenth child), born via surrogacy. Musk confirmed reports that the couple were "semi-separated" in September 2021; in an interview with Time in December 2021, he said he was single. In March 2022, Grimes said of her relationship with Musk: "I would probably refer to him as my boyfriend, but we're very fluid." Later that month, Grimes tweeted that she and Musk had broken up again. In September 2023 it was reported that the pair had had a third child (Musk's eleventh). In October 2023, Grimes sued Musk over parental rights and custody of their eldest.

In July 2022, Insider published court documents revealing that Musk had had his eighth and ninth children, twins born via IVF with Shivon Zilis, director of operations and special projects at Neuralink, in November 2021. They were born weeks before Musk and Grimes had their second child via surrogacy in December. The news "raise[d] questions about workplace ethics", given that Zilis directly reported to Musk. Zilis's third child together with Musk (his twelfth child) was born in early 2024 via surrogacy. His fourth child with Zilis was born in 2025.

On February 14, 2025, Ashley St. Clair, an influencer and author, posted on X claiming to have given birth to Musk's son Romulus five months earlier, which media outlets reported as Musk's supposed thirteenth child.

== Errol Musk ==
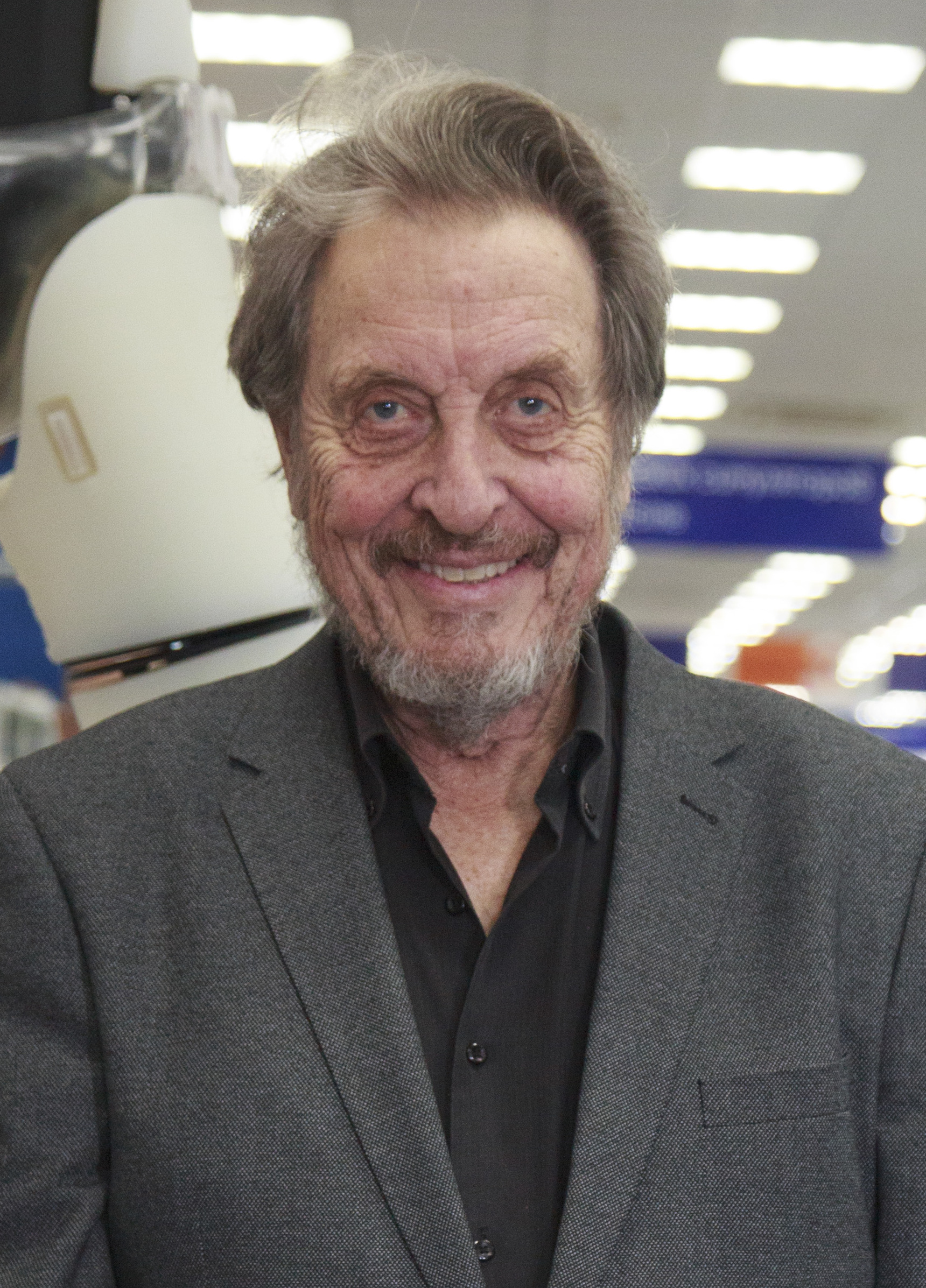
Errol Musk in 2025

Errol Graham Musk (born May 25, 1946) is a South African politician and businessman, who was elected as an independent to represent Sunnyside on the Pretoria City Council in 1972.

Musk worked as an engineer and later owned an auto-parts store and a share in an emerald mine. He was married to Maye Musk from 1970 to 1979.

Maye's book recalls that at the time of the divorce, he owned two homes, a yacht, a plane, five luxury cars, and a truck.

In the early 1990s, Errol, then aged 45, married Heide Bezuidenhout, a 25-year old he described as "one of the best looking women I've ever seen in my life". They had two children. Jana Bezuidenhout, who later became his romantic partner, was his stepdaughter from that marriage, four years old at the time Errol became her stepfather.

Errol Musk's mother, Cora Amelia Robinson, was English from Liverpool, and his father, Walter Henry James Musk, was mostly English-South African.

== Maye Musk ==
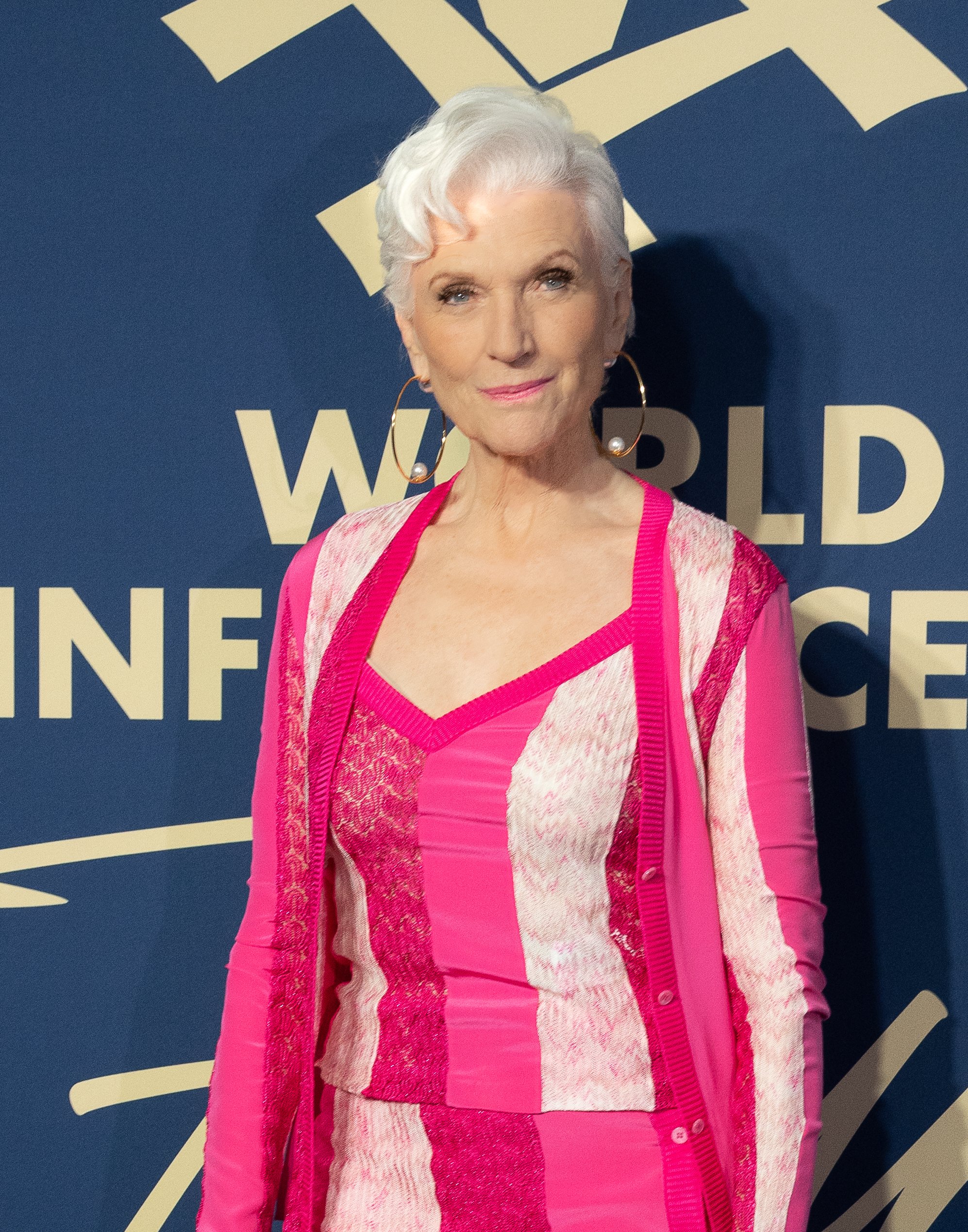
Maye Musk in 2023

Maye Musk (née Haldeman; born April 19, 1948) is a model, dietitian and author. She has been a model for 50 years, appearing on the covers of magazines, including a Time magazine health edition, Women's Day, international editions of Vogue, and Sports Illustrated Swimsuit Issue. She is the mother of Elon Musk, Kimbal Musk and Tosca Musk. She holds Canadian, South African, and American citizenship. She is a registered dietitian. She published her memoir, A Woman Makes a Plan in 2019.

== Joshua Haldeman ==
Joshua Norman Haldeman (November 25, 1902 – January 13, 1974) was an American-born Canadian chiropractor and political activist who, in the early days of formalized apartheid, moved to South Africa. Prior to the move, Haldeman headed the Canadian branch of Technocracy movement and ran for the Parliament of Canada on the Social Credit Party ticket. Over the course of his life, he publicly expressed racist, anti-Semitic, and anti-democratic views, promoted a number of conspiracy theories, and was a supporter of South Africa's apartheid system.

The Haldeman couple spent time searching for the Lost City of the Kalahari by plane. Haldeman's mother Almeda Jane (Norman) Haldeman was the first recorded chiropractor in Canada.

== Wyn Fletcher ==
Winnifred Josephine Fletcher (1914–2012) was born in Moose Jaw, Canada, to English parents. Her older sister Kay Fletcher married the Canadian ice hockey player Elmer Lach.

According to her son-in-law Errol Musk, Wyn and her husband Joshua Haldeman were "fanatical" in favor of apartheid, and supported Nazism. The grandmother of Elon Musk, she told Elon many stories of his grandfather's travels and exploits during his childhood, including slideshows of his trips.

== Walter Musk ==
Walter Henry James Musk was a South African World War II veteran. He was from a mostly English-South African background. According to family memory he served as a cryptographer in a military intelligence unit in Egypt during World War II. He was the paternal grandfather of Elon Musk.

== Cora Robinson ==
Cora Amelia Robinson was born in Edge Hill, Liverpool, to an English father and a South African mother. She moved to South Africa during World War II. Her father, from Toxteth, Liverpool, had emigrated to South Africa where he married her mother in 1911. Her mother was from a Dutch-South African background. They moved to Edge Hill and lived there until World War II.

== Kimbal Musk ==
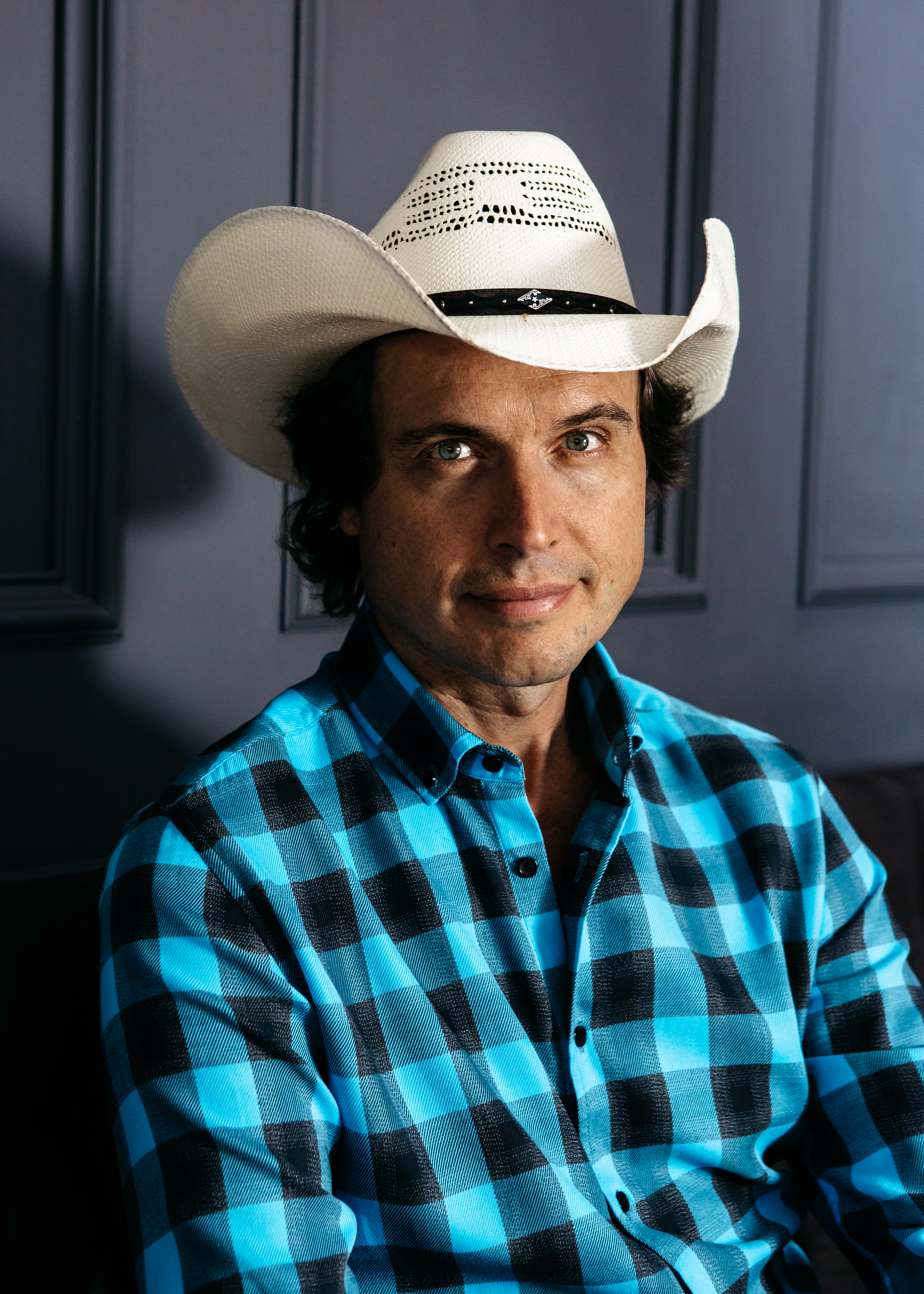
Kimbal Musk in 2013

Kimbal James Musk (born September 20, 1972) is a South African restaurateur, chef, and entrepreneur. He is the brother of Elon Musk and Tosca Musk, and son of Errol and Maye Musk.

He owns The Kitchen Restaurant Group, a collection of restaurants located in Colorado and Chicago. He is the co-founder and chairman of Big Green, a 501(c)(3) nonprofit that has built hundreds of outdoor classrooms called Learning Gardens in schoolyards across America. Musk is also the co-founder and chairman of Square Roots, an urban farming company growing food in hydroponic, indoor, climate controlled shipping containers. Musk currently sits on the boards of Tesla Inc. and SpaceX, both of which his brother Elon is the current CEO. He is a major shareholder in Tesla. He was on the board of Chipotle Mexican Grill from 2013 to 2019.

In 1995 he co-founded, with his brother, Elon Musk, the software company Zip2, which was acquired by Compaq for $307 million in 1999.

Kimbal Musk was married to Jen Lewin, with whom he established The Kitchen, from 2001 to 2010. The couple had two children together. In April 2018, he married Christiana Wyly, an environmental activist and the daughter of ex-billionaire Sam Wyly.

Musk also has a daughter from another relationship.

== Tosca Musk ==
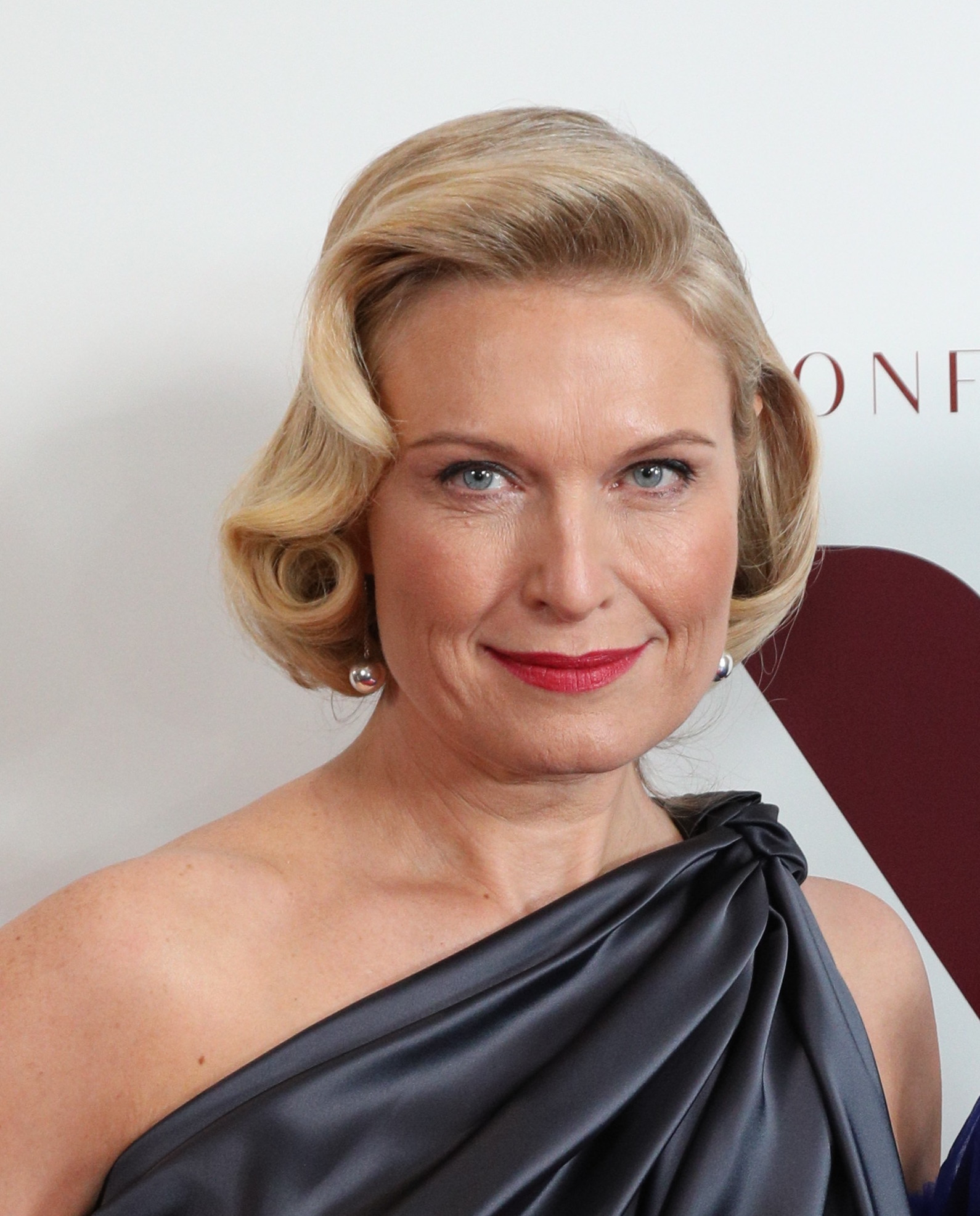
Tosca Musk in 2019

Tosca Musk (born July 20, 1974) is a South African filmmaker, who is the younger sister of Elon Musk and Kimbal Musk, and daughter of Errol Musk and Maye Musk.

She is an executive producer and director of feature films, television programs, and web content. Her work includes K. Bromberg's Driven, Rachel van Dyken's Matchmaker's Playbook, and her web series, Tiki Bar TV. She co-founded the movie-streaming service Passionflix.

== Lyndon Rive ==
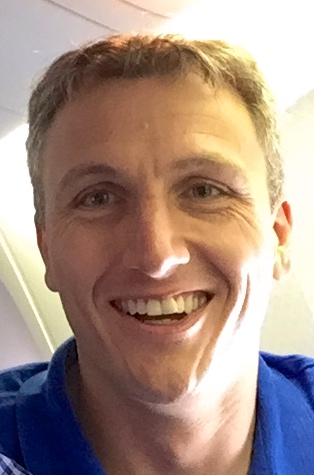
Lyndon Rive in 2015

Lyndon Rive is a South African-American businessman known as the co-founder of SolarCity, and its CEO until 2016. SolarCity is a provider of photovoltaic systems and related services. Rive co-founded SolarCity with his brother Peter in 2006. He is a cousin of Elon Musk; his mother Kaye Rive is the twin sister of Maye Musk.

Rive started his first company at age 17 before leaving his native country, South Africa. He then co-founded the enterprise software company Everdream, which was ultimately acquired by Dell. In 2010, Rive was named in the MIT Technology Review's Innovators Under 35 as one of the top 35 innovators in the world under the age of 35.

Rive's parents were entrepreneurs in the natural-health business in Pretoria, South Africa. Rive has three siblings: SolarCity co-founder Peter Rive, Russ Rive who runs an art, technology, and design company in Brazil, and competitive dirt bike rider Almeda Rive.

== Michael Musk ==
Michael Musk is Errol Musk's brother and Elon Musk's uncle.

== Vivian Wilson ==
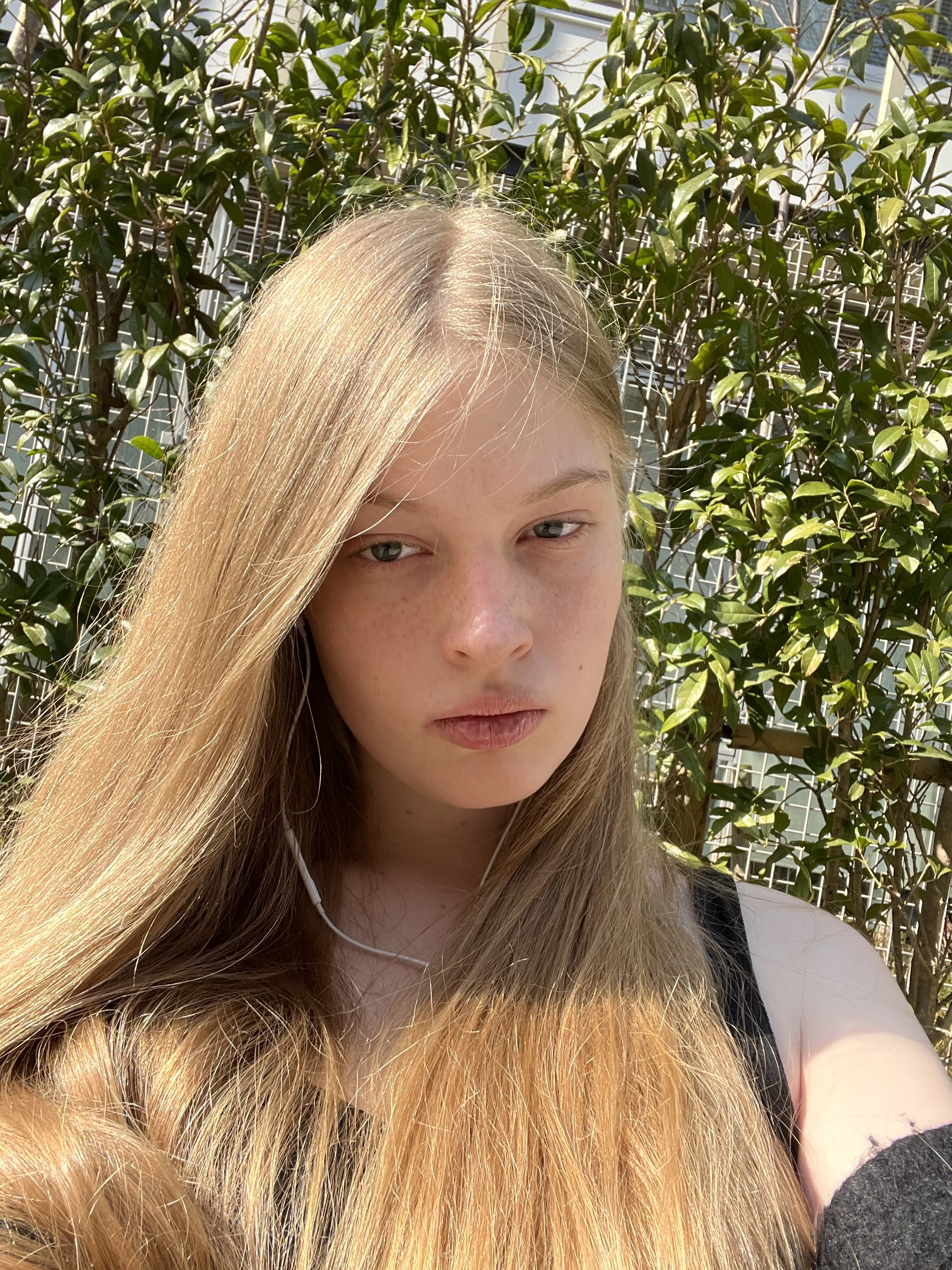
Vivian Wilson in 2025

Vivian Jenna Wilson (born April 15, 2004) is an American social media personality and member of the Musk family. The eldest daughter of Elon and Justine Musk, Wilson came out as a transgender woman in 2020, and was featured in Teen Vogue in 2025. As of March 2025, she is studying in Tokyo. Wilson is estranged from her father and has said she has not spoken to him since 2020.

== X Æ A-Xii Musk ==
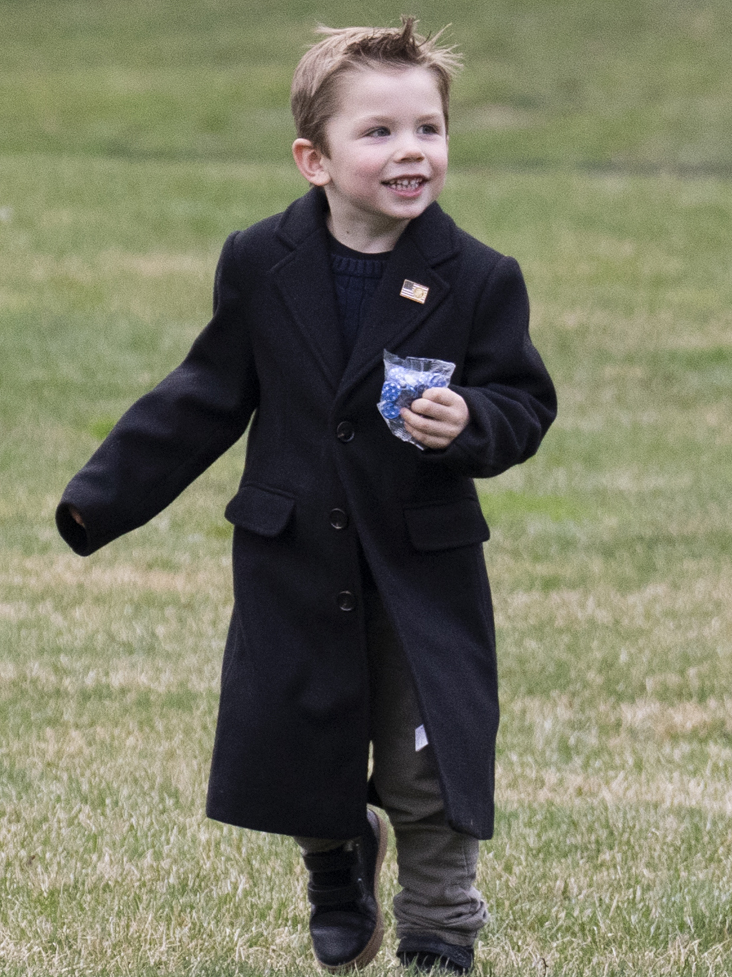
X Æ A-Xii Musk in 2025

X Æ A-Xii Musk (/ˈɛks eɪ.aɪ eɪ twɛlv/ or /ˈɛks æʃ eɪ twɛlv/; born May 4, 2020) is the eldest child of Elon Musk and Grimes. Musk and Grimes originally gave him the name "X Æ A-12", which would have violated California regulations because it contained characters (Arabic numerals) that are not in the modern English alphabet. They then changed it to "X Æ A-Xii". They have received criticism for choosing a name perceived to be impractical and difficult to pronounce.

Elon Musk has taken X Æ A-Xii to multiple official events in Washington, D.C., during Trump's second term in office.
