= Musk (disambiguation) =

Musk, also known as musk oil, is a class of aromatic substances commonly used as base notes in perfumery.

Musk may also refer to:

== Biology ==
- MuSK protein, the MuSK receptor

=== Animals ===
- Musk beetle, a Eurasian species of longhorn beetle belonging to the subfamily Cerambycinae, tribe Callichromatini
- Musk deer, of the species that make up Moschus
- Musk duck, a highly aquatic, stiff-tailed duck native to southern Australia
- Musk lorikeet, a lorikeet, now the only species in the genus Glossopsitta
- Muskox, a hoofed land mammal, native to the Arctic
- Musk turtle (disambiguation), several aquatic turtles
- Muskrat, a medium-sized semiaquatic rodent native to North America
- Musky rat-kangaroo, a marsupial species found only in the rainforests of northeast Australia
- Muskellunge, North American fish nicknamed the "Musky"

=== Plants ===
- Erythranthe moschata, formerly Mimulus moschatus, a yellow-flowered plant known as muskflower or musk
- Musk larkspur (Delphinium brunonianum), a species of larkspur of the family Ranunculaceae
- Musk mallow, various plants from the family Malvaceae
- Musk stork's-bill (Erodium moschatum), a species of flowering plant in the geranium family

== Locations ==
- Musk, Victoria, Australia, a locality
  - Musk railway station, a former railway station
- Musk, a locality in Ontario, Canada
  - Musk station (Ontario), a Via Rail station
- Musk, Iran, a village
- Musk Lake, a sewage lake serving Jeddah, Saudi Arabia

== Media, arts and entertainment ==
- Le Musk, a 2022 Indian virtual reality film directed by A. R. Rahman
- Musk (film), a 2026 documentary film by Alex Gibney

== People ==
- Carol Muske-Dukes (born 1945) U.S. writer
- Elon Musk (born 1971), South African-born American entrepreneur and business magnate
- Errol Musk (born 1946), South African engineer, politician, and businessman
- Kimbal Musk (born 1972), South African-born American entrepreneur, philanthropist, and restaurateur
- Maye Musk (born 1948), Canadian model and dietitian
- Tosca Musk (born 1974), South African filmmaker

== Other uses ==
- Musk (wine), a wine tasting descriptor
- Musk stick, a popular confection in Australia
- HMS Musk, original name of USS Might, a World War II corvette/patrol boat

== See also ==
- Musk turtle (disambiguation)
- Musc (disambiguation)
