= Elon Musk (disambiguation) =

Elon Musk (born 1971) is a South African-born businessman.

Elon Musk may also refer to:

- Elon Musk: Tesla, SpaceX, and the Quest for a Fantastic Future, a 2015 biography of Musk by Ashlee Vance
- Elon Musk (Isaacson book), a 2023 biography of Musk by Walter Isaacson
- "Elon Musk", a 2023 song by Nigerian rapper Shallipopi
- "Elon Musk", a 2023 song by American rapper DDG

== See also ==
- Elon Muskox, a topiary sculpture
- Elon (disambiguation)
- Musk (disambiguation)
