= Public image of Elon Musk =

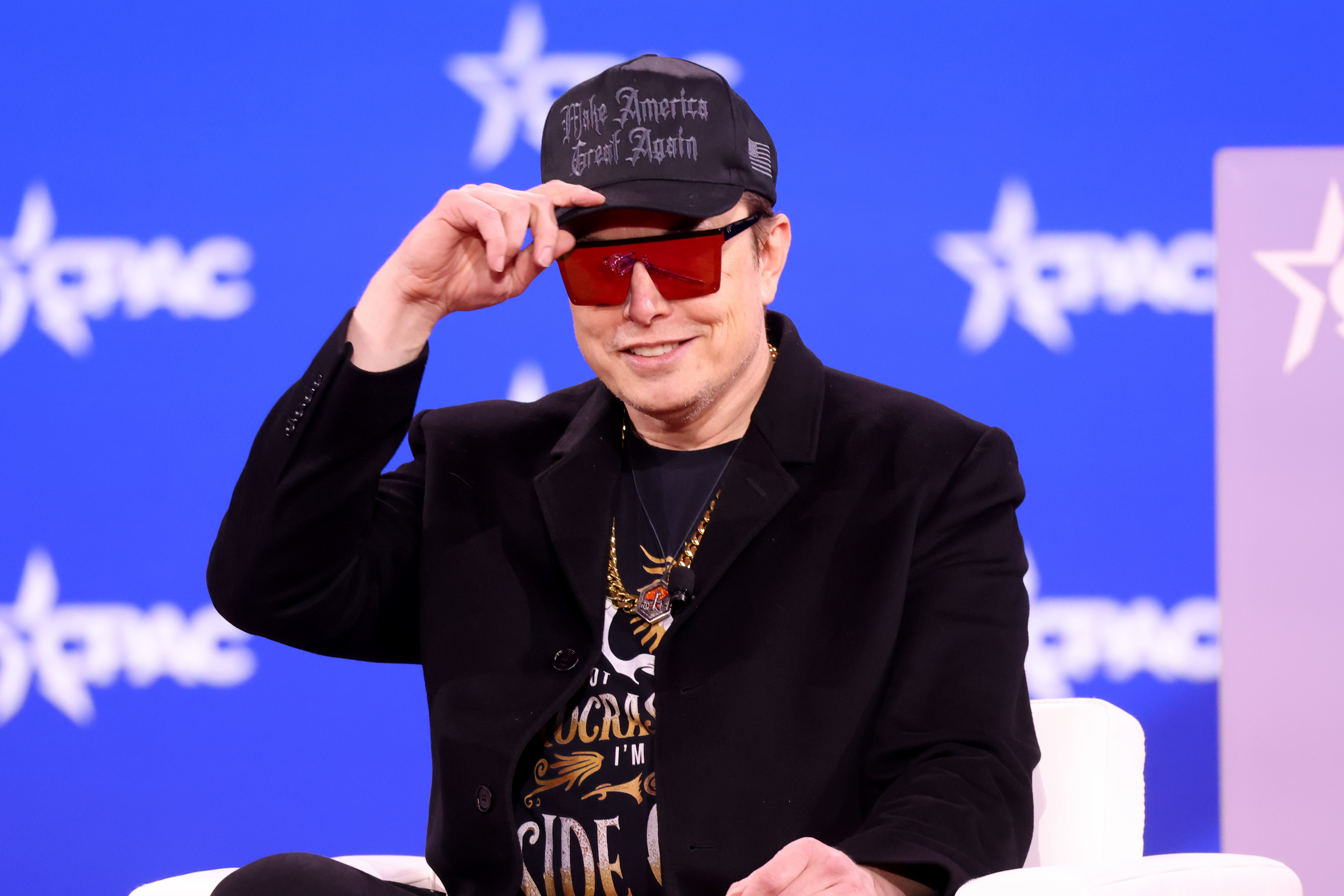
Musk at the 2025 Conservative Political Action Conference

Businessman and U.S. political figure Elon Musk is a focal point of extensive press coverage, with public attitudes towards him fluctuating at various points throughout his career.

Although his ventures have been highly influential within their separate industries starting in the 2000s, Musk only became a public figure in the early 2010s. He has been described as an eccentric who makes spontaneous and impactful decisions, while also frequently making controversial statements, contrary to other billionaires who prefer reclusiveness to protect their businesses. Musk's actions and his expressed views have made him a polarizing figure. Biographer Ashlee Vance described people's opinions of Musk as polarized due to his "part philosopher, part troll" persona on X, formerly known as Twitter.

Commentators including economist Paul Krugman and former U.S. national security official Fiona Hill have described Musk as an American oligarch, citing his extensive influence over public discourse, social media, industry, politics, and government policy. (Note: Oligarch...: Reynolds, Maura (October 28, 2024). "'Everything Is Subservient to the Big Guy': Fiona Hill on Trump and America's Emerging Oligarchy". Politico.; "Donald Trump could turn Elon Musk into an American oligarch". Politico. September 7, 2024.; Borger, Julian (October 25, 2024). "Elon Musk has been in regular contact with Putin for two years, says report". The Guardian. ISSN 0261-3077.; Krugman, Paul (December 19, 2022). "Why Petulant Oligarchs Rule Our World". The New York Times.; Kim, Whizy (November 25, 2024). "Elon Musk and the age of shameless oligarchy". Vox.) His influence before and in the early months of the second presidency of Donald Trump led some to call him the "actual president-elect", "shadow president" or "co-president".

== Accolades ==
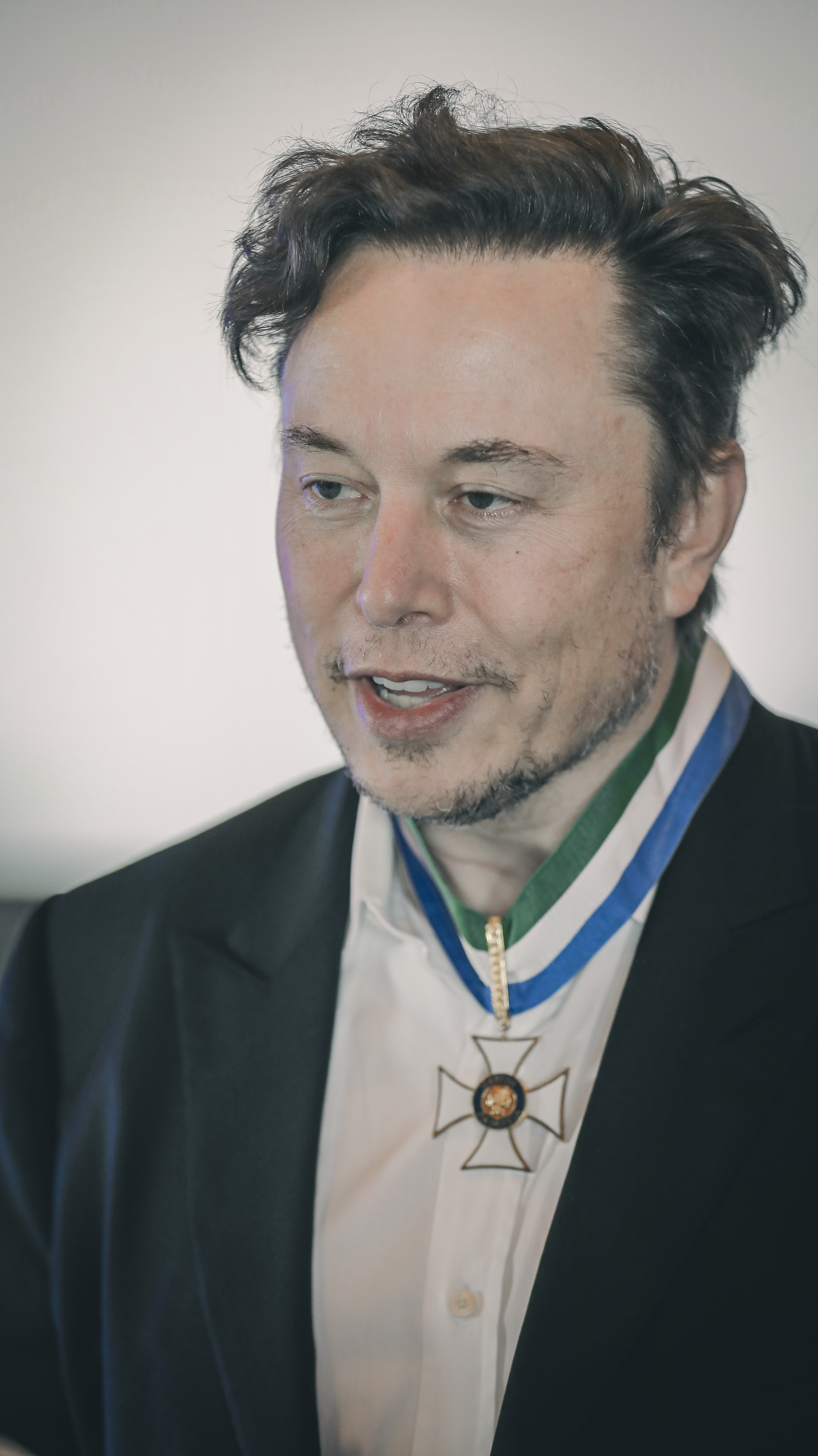
Musk receiving the Order of Defence Merit from the Brazilian Armed Forces in 2022

Awards for his contributions to the development of the Falcon rockets include the American Institute of Aeronautics and Astronautics George Low Transportation Award in 2008, the Fédération Aéronautique Internationale Gold Space Medal in 2010, and the Royal Aeronautical Society Gold Medal in 2012. In 2015, he received an honorary doctorate in engineering and technology from Yale University and an Institute of Electrical and Electronics Engineers Honorary Membership. Musk was elected a Fellow of the Royal Society (FRS) in 2018. (Note: In 2024, Musk's Royal Society membership was criticized by 74 members over his alleged anti-scientific behavior and promotion of misinformation, prompting debates about the society's standards on membership and leading to the resignation of Dorothy Bishop, a neuropsychologist at the University of Oxford, who cited her dissatisfaction with the Society's response.) In 2022, Musk was elected to the National Academy of Engineering.

Time has listed Musk as one of the most influential people in the world in 2010, 2013, 2018, and 2021. Musk was selected as Time's "Person of the Year" for 2021. Then Time editor-in-chief Edward Felsenthal wrote that, "Person of the Year is a marker of influence, and few individuals have had more influence than Musk on life on Earth, and potentially life off Earth too." In the magazine's 2025 selection of 'The Architects of AI' as "Person of the Year", Musk was included among six other CEOs and one computer scientist.

== Musk Foundation ==
Musk is president of the Musk Foundation he founded in 2001, whose stated purpose is to: provide solar-power energy systems in disaster areas; support research, development, and advocacy (for interests including human space exploration, pediatrics, renewable energy and "safe artificial intelligence"); and support science and engineering educational efforts.

As of 2020, the foundation had made 350 donations. Around half of them were made to scientific research or education nonprofits. Notable beneficiaries include the Wikimedia Foundation, his alma mater the University of Pennsylvania, and his brother Kimbal's nonprofit Big Green. From 2002 to 2018, the foundation gave $25 million directly to nonprofit organizations, nearly half of which went to OpenAI, which Musk co-founded, which was a nonprofit at the time. The foundation also allocated $100 million of donations to be used to establish a new higher education university in Texas.

In 2012, Musk took the Giving Pledge, thereby committing to give the majority of his wealth to charitable causes either during his lifetime or in his will. He has endowed prizes at the Xprize Foundation, including $100 million to reward improved carbon capture technology.

Vox said in February 2021, "the Musk Foundation is almost entertaining in its simplicity and yet is strikingly opaque", noting that its website was only 33 words in plain-text. In 2020, Forbes gave Musk a philanthropy score of 1, because he had given away less than 1% of his net worth. In November 2021, Musk donated $5.7 billion of Tesla's shares to charity, according to regulatory filings. However, Bloomberg News noted that all of it went to his own foundation, bringing Musk Foundation's assets up to $9.4 billion at the end of 2021. The foundation disbursed $160 million to nonprofits that year. Reporting by The New York Times found that in 2022, the Musk Foundation gave away $230 million less than the minimum required by law to maintain tax-deductible status, and that in 2021 and 2022 over half the foundation's funds went to causes connected to Musk, his family, or his businesses.

== In popular culture ==
Musk was a partial inspiration for the characterization of Tony Stark in the Marvel film Iron Man (2008). Musk also had a cameo appearance in the film's 2010 sequel, Iron Man 2. Musk has made cameos and appearances in other films such as Machete Kills (2013), Why Him? (2016), and Men in Black: International (2019). Television series in which he has appeared include The Simpsons ("The Musk Who Fell to Earth", 2015), The Big Bang Theory ("The Platonic Permutation", 2015), South Park ("Members Only", 2016), Young Sheldon ("A Patch, a Modem, and a Zantac®", 2017), and Rick and Morty ("One Crew over the Crewcoo's Morty", 2019). He contributed interviews to the documentaries Racing Extinction (2015) and Lo and Behold (2016).

Musk hosted Saturday Night Live (SNL) in May 2021. In August 2024 cast member Bowen Yang said that a male host who had "made multiple cast members cry" was the worst behaved host he had witnessed on SNL. Cast member Chloe Fineman confirmed that the host was Musk and said that his behavior had made her cry. Musk responded that his behavior was due to believing that the material was not funny. Musk was impersonated by Mike Myers during SNL's 50th season in 2025.

== 2018 cannabis incident ==
In September 2018, Musk was interviewed on The Joe Rogan Experience podcast, during which he appeared to smoke a joint. In 2022, Musk said that he and other SpaceX employees had subsequently been required to undergo random drug tests for about a year following the incident, as required by the Drug-Free Workplace Act of 1988 for federal contractors. In a 2019 60 Minutes interview, Musk had said, "I do not smoke pot. As anybody who watched that podcast could tell, I have no idea how to smoke pot."

== Gaming ==
In his leisure time, Musk plays video games including Quake, Diablo IV, Elden Ring, and Polytopia.

In 2024, Musk expressed interest in buying Hasbro in order to secure the rights to Dungeons & Dragons which Musk believed that Hasbro was mismanaging. His interest was met with a generally negative response from Hasbro fans.

In January 2025, several game streamers alleged that Musk had cheated on Path of Exile 2 and Diablo IV by hiring outside services to invest hours of play into his accounts. Musk initially responded by criticizing one of his accusers, the YouTuber Asmongold. Musk later briefly took away Asmongold's verification on Twitter and leaked direct messages between the two of them. Musk's ex-partner Grimes defended his accomplishments saying that she had witnessed many of his Diablo IV records. Musk has since admitted to using account boosting services while stating that "It's impossible to beat players in Asia if you don't."

In 2024 and 2025, Musk criticized the video game Assassin's Creed Shadows and its creator Ubisoft for "woke" content. In 2024, Musk posted to X that "DEI kills art" and specified the inclusion of the historical figure Yasuke in the Assassin's Creed game as offensive. Ubisoft responded by saying that Musk's comments were "just feeding hatred" and that they were focused on producing a game, not pushing politics. In March 2025, after Musk called Shadows a "terrible game" and criticized streamer Hasan Piker for promoting it, the game's official X account replied "is that what the guy playing your Path of Exile 2 account told you?"

== Private jet usage ==
Avatar of Elon Musk

Elon Musk
(@elonmusk)
tweeted:

Unsuspend accounts who doxxed my exact location in real-time

Now	58.7%
In 7 days	41.3%
3,690,639 votes · Final results

December 16, 2022

Musk uses a private jet owned by Falcon Landing LLC, a SpaceX-linked company, and acquired a second jet in August 2020. His heavy use of the jets—which flew over 150,000 miles in 2018 alone—and the consequent fossil fuel usage have received criticism. Musk's flight usage is tracked on social media through ElonJet. After Musk said that his son X Æ A-Xii had been harassed by a stalker after the account posted the airport at which his jet had landed, Musk banned the ElonJet account on Twitter, as well as the accounts of journalists that posted stories regarding the incident, including Donie O'Sullivan, Keith Olbermann, and journalists from The New York Times, The Washington Post, CNN, and The Intercept. Musk equated the reporting to doxxing. Police do not believe there is a link between the account and alleged stalker. Musk later took a Twitter poll on whether the journalists' accounts should be reinstated, which resulted in reinstating the accounts.

== Salute controversy ==
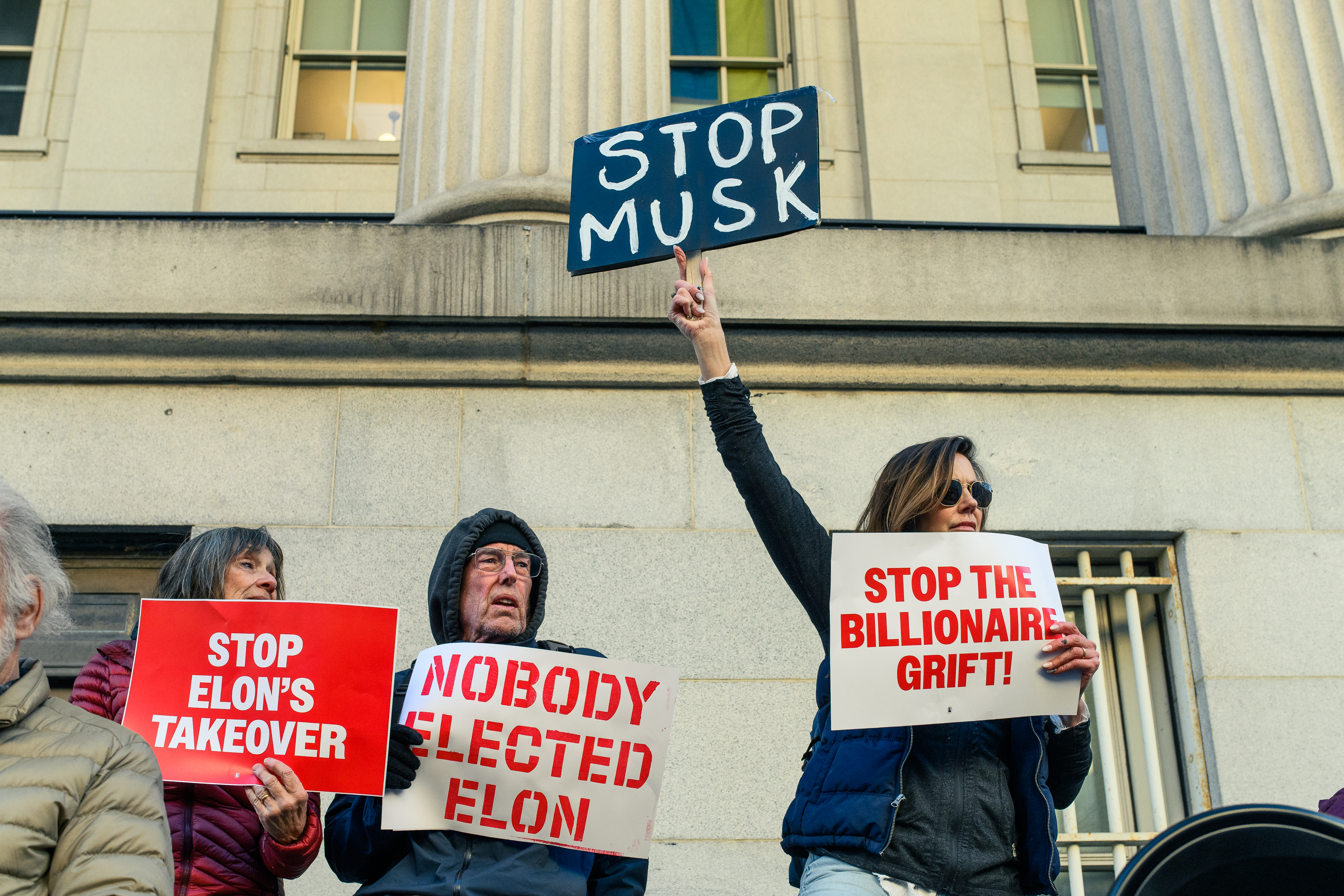
Protesters with anti-Elon Musk signs in Washington, D.C., February 2025

In his speech during the second inauguration of Donald Trump, Musk thumped his right hand over his heart, fingers spread wide, and then extended his right arm out, emphatically, at an upward angle, palm down and fingers together. He then repeated the gesture to the crowd behind him. As he finished the gestures, he said to the crowd, "My heart goes out to you. It is thanks to you that the future of civilization is assured." The gesture was viewed as a Nazi or Roman salute (Note: The "Roman salute" is a gesture which was used by Italian Fascists, then adopted by the Nazis. It is not believed to have been used by ancient Romans.) by some, including politicians Yolanda Díaz, Alexandria Ocasio-Cortez, and Jerry Nadler, as well as historian of fascism Ruth Ben-Ghiat. Austria's Green Party and Germany's Die Linke called for Musk to be banned from entering their respective countries, citing the salute and his support for right-wing extremism and ongoing interference in European politics. Israeli Prime Minister Benjamin Netanyahu said Musk was "falsely smeared".

Musk derided the claims as being politicized; in one post he wrote: "The 'everyone is Hitler' attack is sooo tired", and later on a Joe Rogan podcast discussion published on February 28, Musk reiterated: "I'm not a Nazi", also saying: "What is actually bad about Nazis — it wasn't their fashion or their mannerisms, it was the war and genocide." The Anti-Defamation League stated that Musk did not make a Nazi salute, but "made an awkward gesture in a moment of enthusiasm". Jared Holt from the Institute for Strategic Dialogue, which tracks online hate, also said that he is skeptical it was on purpose, and that it could indicate a sort of gesture of thanks to the crowd. However, former ADL national director Abraham Foxman described the gesture as a "Heil Hitler Nazi salute". In further response to the events, Musk posted a series of puns about Nazis on Twitter, which the ADL condemned as "inappropriate" and "highly offensive". Various media outlets, including the Associated Press, reported that regardless of what Musk meant, his gesture was widely embraced by right-wing extremists and neo-Nazis.

== Jury opinions in trials ==
During jury selection in a 2023 trial over Musk's 2018 tweets about taking Tesla private, numerous prospective jurors expressed strong views about him, with some describing him as "dishonest", "arrogant", or "power-hungry", while others viewed him favorably as an "innovative entrepreneur". In February 2026, federal judge Charles Breyer dismissed more than a third of a 93-person jury pool in a San Francisco trial over Musk's Twitter acquisition because of their biases about him.

== Protests ==
A 50501 protest sign in Columbus, Ohio giving Elon Musk the middle finger. (February 2025)

Beginning in 2019, protests against Elon Musk emerged in response to a series of controversies, with the latest wave in 2025 focusing on his role in the Department of Government Efficiency (DOGE) and the second Trump administration.

Hundreds of demonstrations took place across the United States, accompanied by additional protests in Canada, Germany, Portugal, and the United Kingdom. Although the coordinated protests were largely peaceful, several incidents of vandalism were reported, along with the discovery of incendiary devices and explosives at Tesla facilities.

Musk's involvement in far-right politics and European election campaigns further intensified the backlash on a global scale. Protesters often targeted Tesla stores and showrooms, viewing them as extensions of Musk’s influence and a symbol of his perceived political and economic power.

=== Tesla Takedown ===
Tesla Takedown is a grassroots protest movement that arose in early 2025 targeting Tesla, Inc. and its CEO, Elon Musk. Protesters have organized demonstrations at Tesla stores across the United States, Canada, Europe, and Australasia. The movement urges the public to divest from Tesla by selling their vehicles and shares of Tesla stock, with the goal to economically impact Musk and challenge his political influence peacefully.

== See also ==
- Make America Wait Again
