= Muskie (disambiguation) =

The muskie is a species of freshwater fish native to North America.

Muskie may also refer to:

- Muskie Act, nickname for the U.S. Clean Air Act of 1963
- Muskie Muskrat, a character in American Deputy Dawg cartoons
- Big Muskie, an enormous coal-mining dragline excavator used in Ohio, U.S.
- Edmund Muskie (1914–1996), American politician
- Jane Muskie (1927–2004), First Lady of Maine
- Muskingum Fighting Muskies, team name for Muskingum University in New Concord, Ohio
- Muskie, a 1996 IBM RS64 microprocessor used in AS/400 machines
- Muskie 101, branding for radio station WHSM-FM in Hayward, Wisconsin, U.S.
- Muskies, team name for Muscatine High School in Muscatine, Iowa, U.S.

== See also ==
- Carol Muske-Dukes (born 1945) U.S. writer
- Musk (disambiguation)
