= Double 8 Foods =

Grocery chain based in Indianapolis, Indiana, US (1957–2015)

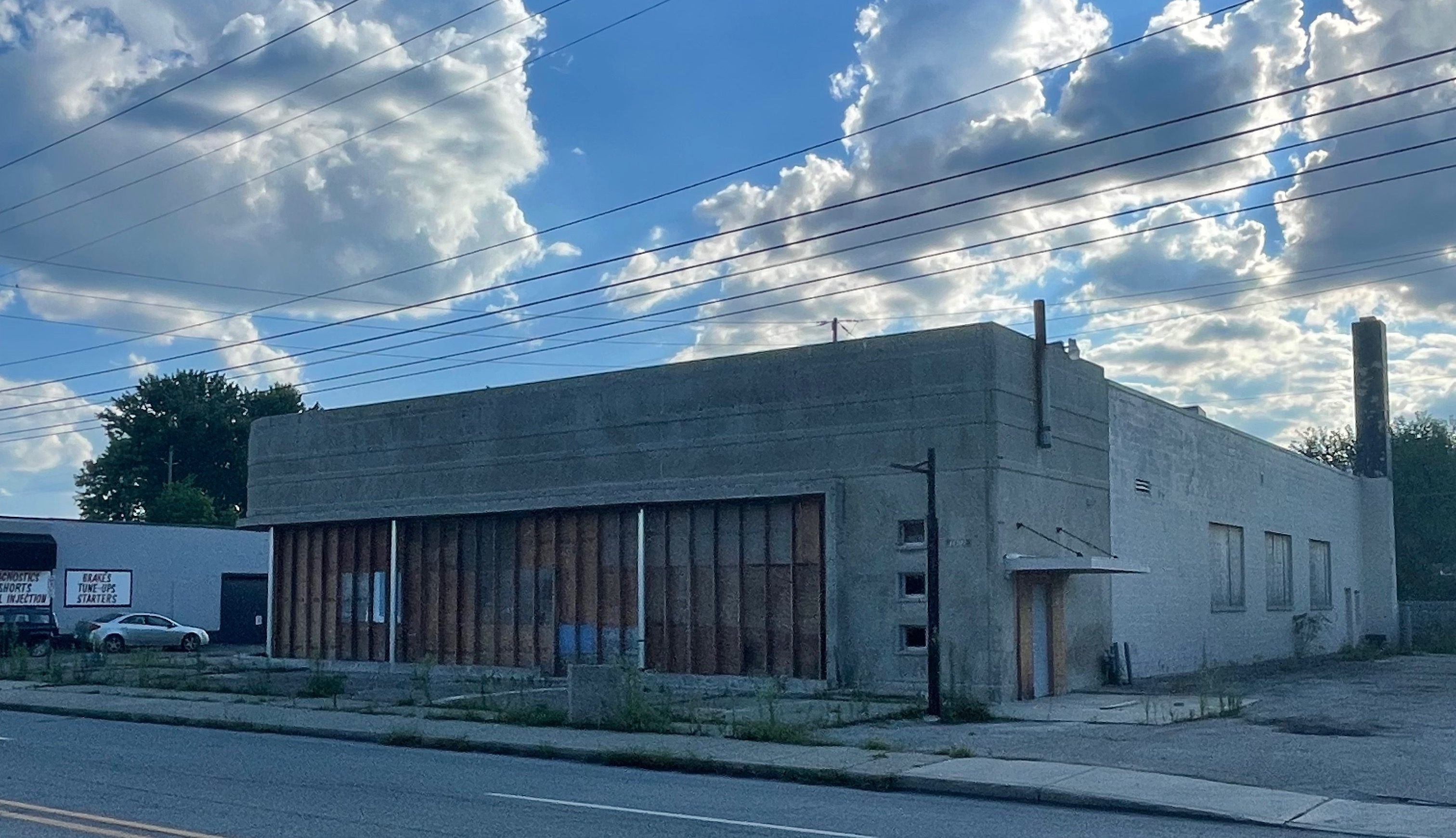
Former Double 8 Foods store on Illinois Street in Indianapolis, Indiana.

Double 8 Foods was a local grocery chain based in Indianapolis. It opened under the name "Seven-Eleven Supermarket" in 1957 and renamed to Double 8 in 2000. The stores differentiated themselves by including soul food like chitterlings, catfish, and pork ribs. In 2015, the chain shut down among continuing revenue losses and larger operators unwilling to take it over creating food deserts. The buildings Double 8 used have since been used for breweries and restaurants.

== History ==
Double 8 Foods, formerly known as Seven-Eleven Supermarket, was founded by Zoltan Weisz in 1957. The first store was opened on North Sherman Drive in Indianapolis. In 1959, the firm was the first grocery company in Indiana to employ an African American store manager. In 2003, dollar stores and "dollar aisles" were integrated within the company's locations starting with the chain's store on Fairfield Avenue. The chain was operated by Isaiah Kuperstein prior to its shutdown. Weisz was the great-uncle of Kuperstein's wife, Elana.

== Closing ==
Double 8 Foods shut down all of its stores on July 23, 2015, citing decreasing sales as the primary factor for their closing. Customers were not made aware of the chain's upcoming closure until the day the stores closed down. Employees were similarly in the dark regarding their imminent terminations. The company faced increasing competition from larger chains like Walmart and Meijer as well as dollar stores opening up near store locations. To save the stores, the firm attempted to woo another operator but was unsuccessful.

=== Food deserts ===
The sudden closure of Double 8 Foods left many residents without a convenient source for groceries. As a result, local churches and the fire department began offering transportation to other grocery stores. The president of the Indianapolis Urban League, Tony Mason, released a statement regarding Double 8's shutdown announcing a partnership with local government officials to distribute resource guides to affected locals.

== Aftermath ==
The buildings that Double 8 Foods used have since been repurposed for new businesses. The store on N. Illinois St. has transformed into a brewery named Happy Brewing Co. A warehouse on E. 46th St. now houses a brewery called Black Circle Brewing as well as a co-working space for home-service providers like electricians and plumbers. A restaurant named Next Door American Eatery opened up on the former Double 8 location on the corner of N. College Ave. and E. 46th St. owned by Kimbal Musk.
