= Lyndon Rive =

South African businessman (born 1977)

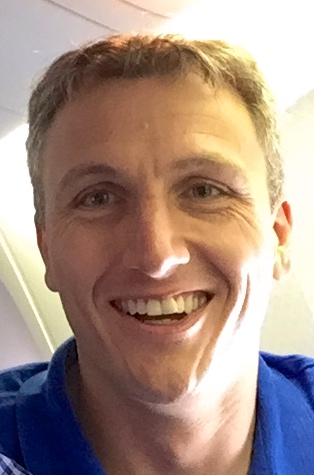
- Rive in 2015
- Born: Lyndon Robert Rive; 22 January 1977 (age 49); Pretoria, South Africa
- Occupation: Businessman
- Known for: Co-founder and former CEO of SolarCity
- Political party: Republican
- Relatives: Elon Musk (cousin); Kimbal Musk (cousin); Tosca Musk (cousin); Maye Musk (aunt); Errol Musk (former uncle-by-marriage); Joshua N. Haldeman (grandfather)

Lyndon Robert Rive (born 22 January 1977) is a South African-American businessman known as the co-founder of SolarCity, and its CEO until 2016. SolarCity was a provider of photovoltaic systems and related services. By the early 2010s, it became the largest residential solar installer in the United States. Rive co-founded SolarCity with his brother Peter in 2006.

Rive started his first company at age 17 before leaving his native country, South Africa. He then co-founded the enterprise software company Everdream, which was ultimately acquired by Dell. In 2010, Rive was named in the MIT Technology Review's Innovators Under 35 as one of the top 35 innovators in the world under the age of 35.

After Tesla, Inc. acquired SolarCity in 2016, Rive announced in 2017 that he would leave the company and spend his time with his family along with further entrepreneurial activities, including working on a new startup.

== Awards ==
In 2013, Rive was an Ernst & Young Entrepreneur of the Year Award winner in the Northern California Region. Silicon Valley/San Jose Business Journal designated Rive and his brother 2008's Executive of the Year.

== Personal life ==
Lyndon Robert Rive and his wife, Madeleine, were high school sweethearts in South Africa. He met her when he was 14. They started dating two years later.

Both have been good underwater hockey players. Rive started playing when he was 14. Underwater hockey played a big part in how Rive ended up in the US. He played for South Africa at the World Championship in 1998, which was held in San Jose, CA. He was so taken by San Jose that he decided to move permanently to the US with his wife. Rive recounts how he had been unable to get his green card despite starting two companies in the United States. Madeleine got hers through the 'exceptional ability' category by virtue of being a good underwater hockey player, and Rive was eventually able to get his through marriage. Ironically, it was Lyndon who had introduced his wife to the sport. They had to wait three years to play for the US team. Their first World Championship for the US was in 2004 in Canada. He played for the men's team and Madeleine for the women's team.

Rive's parents were entrepreneurs in the natural-health business in Pretoria, South Africa.

Rive is a cousin of Elon Musk as their mothers are twin sisters.
