= Joshua N. Haldeman =

Canadian-South African politician and chiropractor (1902–1974)

Leader of the Social Credit Party of Saskatchewan
- In office 1945 – c. 1950
- Preceded by: Joseph Needham
- Succeeded by: Martin Kelln

Personal details
- Born: Joshua Norman Haldeman; November 25, 1902 Pequot Lakes, Minnesota, U.S.
- Died: January 13, 1974 (aged 71) Pretoria, South Africa
- Party: Social Credit Party of Saskatchewan
- Other political affiliations: Social Credit Party of Canada
- Spouses: Eve Peters (m. 1934; div. 1937) Winnifred Fletcher (m. 1942)
- Children: 5, including Maye
- Relatives: Elon Musk (grandson); Kimbal Musk (grandson); Tosca Musk (granddaughter); Lyndon Rive (grandson); Vivian Wilson (great-granddaughter)
- Education: Palmer School of Chiropractic (DC)
- Occupation: Chiropractor, politician, speaker

Joshua Norman Haldeman (November 25, 1902 – January 13, 1974) was an American-born Canadian-South African chiropractor, aviator, explorer, and politician. He became involved in Canadian politics, backing the technocracy movement, before moving to South Africa in 1950. Over the course of decades, Haldeman repeatedly expressed racist, antisemitic, and antidemocratic views. In South Africa he was a supporter of apartheid and promoted a number of conspiracy theories. A pilot since 1948, he died in a plane crash in 1974. Haldeman is the maternal grandfather of Elon Musk.

== Early life, family and education ==
Haldeman was born in 1902 in Pequot Lakes, Minnesota, to father John Elon Haldeman, whose Mennonite ancestors had migrated to the US from the Swiss village of Signau in the 18th century to escape religious persecution, and mother Almeda Jane (Norman) Haldeman. He had a sister, also named Almeda. When he was two years old, his father was diagnosed with diabetes; in an effort to treat her husband, his mother studied at E. W. Lynch's Chiropractic School in Minneapolis and earned her D.C. on January 20, 1905. The family then moved to Saskatchewan, where she became the first recorded chiropractor in Canada.

John Haldeman died in 1909. Almeda Haldeman remarried to Heseltine Wilson. Joshua Haldeman was reared on Wilson's ranch.

Haldeman c. 1926

Haldeman attended a number of colleges and universities, including Moose Jaw College, Regina College, Manitoba Agricultural College, and the University of Chicago. He graduated in 1926 from B. J. Palmer's Palmer School of Chiropractic in Iowa. Haldeman remained a friend of Palmer and a user of the neurocalometer, a device which Palmer leased to practitioners.

== Early career ==
After a short time practicing as a chiropractor, Haldeman concentrated on farming, but the Great Depression led to his losing the farm in the mid-1930s. Thereafter, he worked in a variety of jobs including as a cowboy and a rodeo performer, then resumed a career as a chiropractor.

Haldeman represented Saskatchewan at the founding of the Dominion Council of Canadian Chiropractors (later the Canadian Chiropractic Association) and was elected provincial representative in 1943. He was a founder member of the board of the Canadian Memorial Chiropractic College. In 1947, he was elected vice president of the DCCC, and from 1948 to 1950 he was its appointed representative to the board of control of the International Chiropractors Association.

== Political activity in Canada ==
From 1936 to 1941, he was involved in Howard Scott's Technocracy Incorporated, which led to his arrest under the wartime Defence of Canada Regulations on October 8, 1940, in Vancouver by the Royal Canadian Mounted Police on a charge of membership in an illegal organization. Technocracy Incorporated had been banned in Canada following the start of World War II since the organization was deemed subversive to the war effort. He was returned to Regina and released on $8,000 bail; at trial, he was fined $200 for his role "writing, publishing, or circulating" a document titled "Statement of Patriotism by Those Who Were Technocrats", which the court deemed likely to cause "disaffection to His Majesty".

In 1941, he resigned from that group and for two years attempted to form his own political party, publishing a newsletter titled Total War & Defence. As an avowed anti-communist, Haldeman objected to Technocracy Incorporated's declaration of support for the Soviet Union following the German invasion of the Soviet Union in 1941. Haldeman's son-in-law Errol Musk claimed in 2024 that Haldeman sympathized with Nazi Germany during World War II.

In 1943, Haldeman joined the Social Credit Party of Canada and served as the Social Credit Party of Saskatchewan's leader, but failed to be elected in the constituency of Yorkton in the 1948 Saskatchewan general election.

During that time, Haldeman formally made statements discouraging the publicizing of the prevalent antisemitism in the party. However, he also gave a speech defending a decision by a party newspaper to publish the Protocols of the Elders of Zion, an antisemitic fabrication claiming an International Jewish conspiracy to rule the world. In his speech, Haldeman said "that the plan as outlined in these protocols has been rapidly unfolding in the period of observation of this generation."

In the 1945 Canadian federal election, he made a bid for a seat in the federal parliament, placing fourth in Prince Albert with 4.3% of the vote, losing to Prime Minister William Lyon Mackenzie King. In 1946, he cited the party's opposition to communism in the press. In the 1949 Canadian federal election he ran in Lake Centre losing to future prime minister John Diefenbaker.

He was chairman of the party's national council until 1949, when he resigned.

== South Africa ==
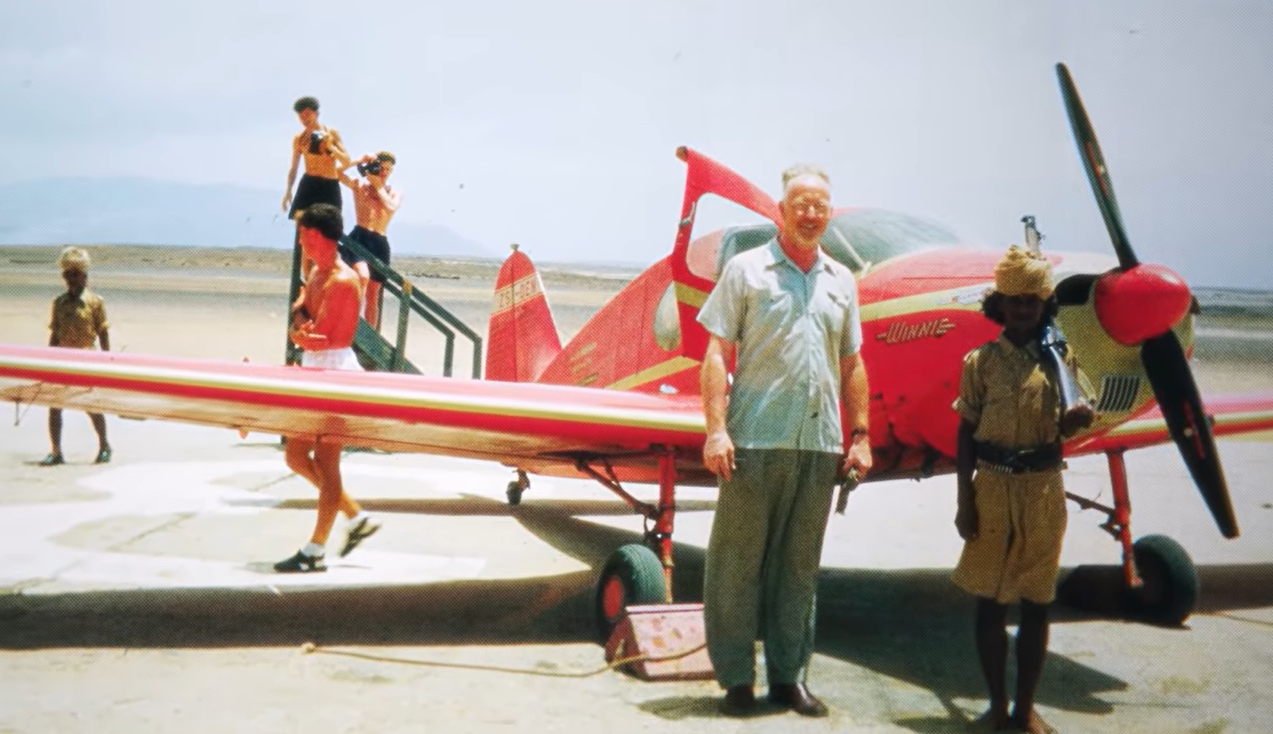
Joshua Haldeman with a local askari, 1960s

In 1950, he emigrated with his family to South Africa and settled in the capital Pretoria, where he opened a chiropractic clinic. He served as secretary of the South African Chiropractors Association from 1952 to 1959, after which he was its president until 1969.

Haldeman's move to South Africa was motivated by support for apartheid, and he was a supporter of the ruling National Party of South Africa. Errol Musk said of his wife's family: "They were very fanatical in favor of apartheid... [Maye's] parents came to South Africa from Canada because they sympathised with the Afrikaner government." Haldeman told Afrikaner nationalist Die Transvaler, an extremist newspaper that was described as "a tool of the Nazis in South Africa" by a South African judge: "Instead of the Government's attitude keeping me out of South Africa, it had precisely the opposite effect—it encouraged me to come and settle here."

In 1951, he wrote an article about South Africa for the Saskatchewan newspaper, the Regina Leader-Post, defending apartheid and writing of Black South Africans: "The natives are very primitive and must not be taken seriously... Some are quite clever in a routine job, but the best of them cannot assume responsibility and will abuse authority. The present government of South Africa knows how to handle the native question."

Weeks after the Sharpeville massacre on 21 March 1960, Haldeman self-published The International Conspiracy to Establish a World Dictatorship and the Menace to South Africa, in which he claimed that a coordinated international propaganda campaign is being carried out against the Whites because "the white man's integrity, initiative and independence make him the most difficult to control". He described apartheid South Africa as the leading "White Christian Civilization" and a bulwark against the "evils of Internationalism". He also criticized the Black liberation movements for attempting to "oust the white man, who has in a few years brought their people from primitive savagery to a great measure of peace and security."

Later Haldeman self-published a second book alleging international conspiracies: The International Conspiracy in Health targeted fluoridation, vaccinations, and health insurance. While Haldeman opposed the state mandating systems for the White population, for the Black population he wrote that "The State has the right to do for them what it thinks is best, the same rights as the parents have for their children".

== Personal life and death ==
Haldeman married Eve Peters in 1934. Their first child, Joshua Jerry Noel Haldeman, was born the same year. The couple divorced by 1937. He remarried in 1942 to Winnifred Josephine Fletcher, a dance teacher, with whom he had 4 children, including twin daughters, Maye and Kaye, born in 1948. Through his daughter Maye, his grandson is billionaire businessman Elon Musk.

To facilitate travel between his home and practice in Regina and his various other commitments, including the ICA in Davenport, Iowa, Haldeman took flying lessons, earning his pilot's license in 1948 and buying a single-engine plane. He and his second wife became known as flying enthusiasts, toured North America, and in the mid-1950s co-wrote a book titled The Flying Haldemans: Pity the Poor Private Pilots. The Haldemans continued to fly extensively after moving to South Africa. In 1954, they flew some 30,000 miles to Australia and back via Asia, possibly the longest journey by a private pilot in a single-engine plane. Beginning in 1953, they also undertook a dozen expeditions in search of the "Lost City of the Kalahari". Haldeman co-founded the Aircraft Owners and Pilots Association of South Africa and served as a representative on the Civil Aviation Advisory Council and the Air Navigation Regulations Committee of South Africa. In 1956, he also tied for first place in the third edition of the trans-Africa Algiers-Cape Town Rally, driving a Ford Ranch-Wagon 5.4L.

On January 13, 1974, he and a passenger were killed when his plane's wheels caught in a powerline during a practice landing in his plane.

== Electoral record ==
1949 Canadian federal election: Lake Centre
Party	Candidate	Votes
Progressive Conservative	John Diefenbaker	8,845
Co-operative Commonwealth	Delmar Valleau	5,413
Liberal	Donald Arthur MacRae	3,061
Social Credit	Joshua Haldeman	856

1948 Saskatchewan general election, Yorkton electoral district
Party	Candidate	Votes	%	±%
CCF	Arthur Percy Swallow	3,795	42.91	–
Liberal	Andrew M. Kindred	3,256	36.82	–
Social Credit	Joshua N. Haldeman	1,792	20.26	–
Total		8,843	100.00	

1945 Canadian federal election: Prince Albert
Party	Candidate	Votes	%	±%	Elected
Co-operative Commonwealth	Edward LeRoy Bowerman	7,928	40.99	+30.0	✓
Liberal	William Lyon Mackenzie King	7,799	40.32	−5.6	
Progressive Conservative	Walter Hemming Nelson	2,768	14.31		
Social Credit	Joshua Norman Haldeman	847	4.38		
Total valid votes		19,342	100.0		
Co-operative Commonwealth gain from Liberal		Swing		+17.8	
Source(s) "Prince Albert, Saskatchewan (1908-09-17 - 1988-09-30)". History of Federal Ridings Since 1867. Library of Parliament.
