= Musc =

Musc or MUSC may refer to:

- MuSC (muscle stem cell), a type of cell
- Abel Santamaría Airport (ICAO airport code MUSC), Santa Clara, Villa Clara, Cuba
- Medical University of South Carolina
- Melbourne University Soccer Club
- Monash University Malaysia (Monash University Sunway Campus)
- Macquarie University Students' Council
- McMaster University Student Centre
- Marian University (Indiana) Sports Club
- Manchester United Supporters Club for Manchester United F.C.
- Músc, an Irish surname of the Clan Corcu Duibne
- Músc, an Irish surname of the Clan Múscraige

== See also ==
- Musk (disambiguation)
