= Make America Wait Again =

Sculpture of Elon Musk by an anonymous American artist

- Artist: Unknown
- Year: 2025
- Medium: Sculpture
- Subject: Elon Musk
- Dimensions: 3.7 m (12 ft)

Make America Wait Again is a sculpture of Elon Musk. The Michigan-based artist's identity is unknown. According to NBC Montana, the sculpture took approximately six weeks to complete and was "first drafted in a computer model, prior to being 3D-printed and reinforced".

== Description ==
The 12-foot tall sculpture is a bust of Elon Musk. He has a "smug expression", according to La Voce di New York. Cowboy State Daily wrote, "Sporting a well-coiffed mane, blank eyes and a satisfied smirk, the Musk bust rests under a canopy held up by pillars adorned by patriotic blue stars." Text reads, "Make America Wait Again. Now With Longer Lines Thanks To DOGE Cuts." The work is considered a form of political protest, seemingly in response to the Department of Government Efficiency's (DOGE) cuts to the National Park Service.

== History ==
The sculpture has appeared at Arches National Park, Mount Rainier National Park, Yellowstone National Park, and Yosemite National Park.

== See also ==
- 2025 in art
- Make America Great Again, American political slogan
- Protest art
- Protests against Elon Musk
- Protests against the second Trump administration
- Public image of Elon Musk
- Response to the Department of Government Efficiency
