= Musk mallow =

Musk mallow or musk-mallow may refer to the following plants from the family Malvaceae:

- Abelmoschus moschatus, native to India
- Malva alcea, native to southern and eastern Europe and southwestern Asia, also known as the Greater Musk-mallow
- Malva moschata, native to Europe and southwestern Asia, also known as the Musk-mallow
