= Elon Musk: Tesla, SpaceX, and the Quest for a Fantastic Future =

2015 book by Ashlee Vance

- Author: Ashlee Vance
- Language: English
- Subject: Biography
- Publisher: HarperCollins
- Publication date: May 19, 2015
- Pages: 400pp
- ISBN: 978-0062301239

Elon Musk: Tesla, SpaceX, and the Quest for a Fantastic Future is an unofficial biography of Elon Musk, written by Ashlee Vance and published on May 19, 2015.

== Description ==
The book traces Elon Musk's life from his childhood up to the time he spent at Zip2 and PayPal, and then onto SpaceX, Tesla, and SolarCity. In the book, Vance interviews Musk, those close to him, and those who were with him at the most important points of his life. Musk had no control over the biography's contents.

== Reception ==
Matt McFarland wrote in The Washington Post "Vance paints an unforgettable picture of Musk's unique personality, insatiable drive and ability to thrive through hardship." Dwight Garner, writing in The New York Times, wrote, "Mr. Vance delivers a well-calibrated portrait of Elon Musk, so that we comprehend both his friends and his enemies... The best thing Mr. Vance does in this book, though, is tell Elon Musk's story simply and well."

It was declared one of the best books of 2015 by The Wall Street Journal, NPR, Amazon.com, Fast Company and Audible.
