= Zip2 =

American software company

Zip2 Corp.
- Formerly: Global Link Information Network (1995–1996)
- Type: Private
- Founded: June 7, 1995; 31 years ago
- Founder: Elon Musk; Kimbal Musk; Greg Kouri
- Defunct: July 28, 2003
- Fate: Purchased by Compaq Computer
- Headquarters: Palo Alto, California, U.S.
- Area served: United States
- Products: Zip2.com; Auto Guide
- Parent: Compaq Computer (1999–)
- Website: zip2.com at the Wayback Machine (archived 2 February 1999)

Zip2 Corp. was a company that provided and licensed online city guide software to newspapers. The company was founded in Palo Alto, California, as Global Link Information Network, Inc. on November 9, 1995, by Greg Kouri and brothers Elon and Kimbal Musk. Initially, Global Link provided local businesses with an Internet presence, but later began to assist newspapers in designing online city guides before being purchased by Compaq Computer in 1999.

== History ==
According to Elon Musk, he got the initial business idea from a summer internship in 1994. A Yellow Pages salesman came into his employer's office to pitch buying an online business listing in addition to the traditional listing in the Yellow Pages book.

Global Link Information Network, Inc. was incorporated in November 1995 by brothers Elon and Kimbal Musk and Greg Kouri in Palo Alto, California, with money raised from a small group of angel investors, plus US$2,000 from Elon, US$5,000 from Kimbal and US$8,000 from Kouri. (Note: Equivalent to $4,000, $10,000 and $15,000, respectively, in 2025) In Ashlee Vance's biography of Elon Musk, it is claimed that their father, Errol Musk, provided the brothers with US$28,000 during this time, (Note: Equivalent to $54,000 in 2025) Elon Musk initially denied this account, but later stated that his father had contributed approximately 10 percent of a US$200,000 funding round, (Note: Equivalent to $385,000 in 2025) clarifying that the investment occurred at a later stage.

Initially, Global Link provided local businesses with an Internet presence by linking their services to searchers and providing directions. Elon Musk combined a free Navteq database with a Palo Alto business database to create the first system.

In an effort to woo investors, Elon Musk built a large casing around a standard computer to give the impression that Zip2 was powered by a supercomputer. The Ashlee Vance biography of Musk states:

Ever marketing savvy, the Musk brothers tried to make their Web service seem more important by giving it an imposing physical body. Musk built a huge case around a standard PC and lugged the unit onto a base with wheels. When prospective investors would come by, Musk would put on a show and roll this massive machine out so that it appeared like Zip2 ran inside of a mini-supercomputer. "The investors thought that was impressive," Kimbal said.

In 1996, Global Link received US$3 million (Note: Equivalent to $5.68 million in 2025) in investments from Mohr Davidow Ventures and officially changed its name to Zip2. Davidow Ventures changed the fundamental strategy of Zip2 from localized direct-to-business sales to instead selling software packages to newspapers to build their own directories. Elon Musk was appointed the Chief Technology Officer and Rich Sorkin became the chief executive officer. Zip2 trademarked "We Power the Press" as its official slogan and continued to grow. Zip2 struck deals with The New York Times, Knight Ridder, and Hearst Corporation, and its collaboration with newspapers made it a major component of "the U.S. newspaper industry's response to the online city guide industry", according to the Editor & Publisher.

By 1998, the company had partnered with about 160 newspapers to develop guides to cities, either locally or at full scale. According to chairman and co-founder Elon Musk, twenty of those newspapers led to full-scale city guides. The New York Times reported that Zip2 also provided newspapers with an online directory, calendar, and email alongside their core offering.

== Product ==
Zip2 allowed for two-way communication between users and advertisers. Users could message advertisers and have that message forwarded to their fax machine. Likewise, advertisers could fax users and users could view that fax using specific URLs.

One Zip2 product was called "Auto Guide". AutoGuide connected online newspaper users with local dealership or private party car sellers.

== Merger and acquisition attempts ==
In April 1998, Zip2 attempted to merge with CitySearch, its main competitor. While Elon Musk initially supported the merger, he persuaded the board of directors not to proceed with it. According to The New York Times, the two companies "cited incompatibilities in cultures and technology" as the reason for the merger's failure.

In 1999, Compaq Computer paid US$305 million (Note: Equivalent to $553 million in 2025) to acquire Zip2. Elon and Kimbal Musk, the original founders, netted US$22 million and US$15 million respectively. (Note: Equivalent to $39.9 million and $27.2 million, respectively, in 2025) The company was purchased to enhance Compaq's AltaVista web search engine.
