= Musk turtle =

Musk turtle is the common name given to three genera of aquatic turtles, all in the New World family Kinosternidae:

- Sternotherus, the musk turtles proper
- Staurotypus, variously called Mexican, three-keeled, or giant musk turtles
- Claudius, the narrow-bridged musk turtle
