= Maye Musk =

Model and dietitian (born 1948)

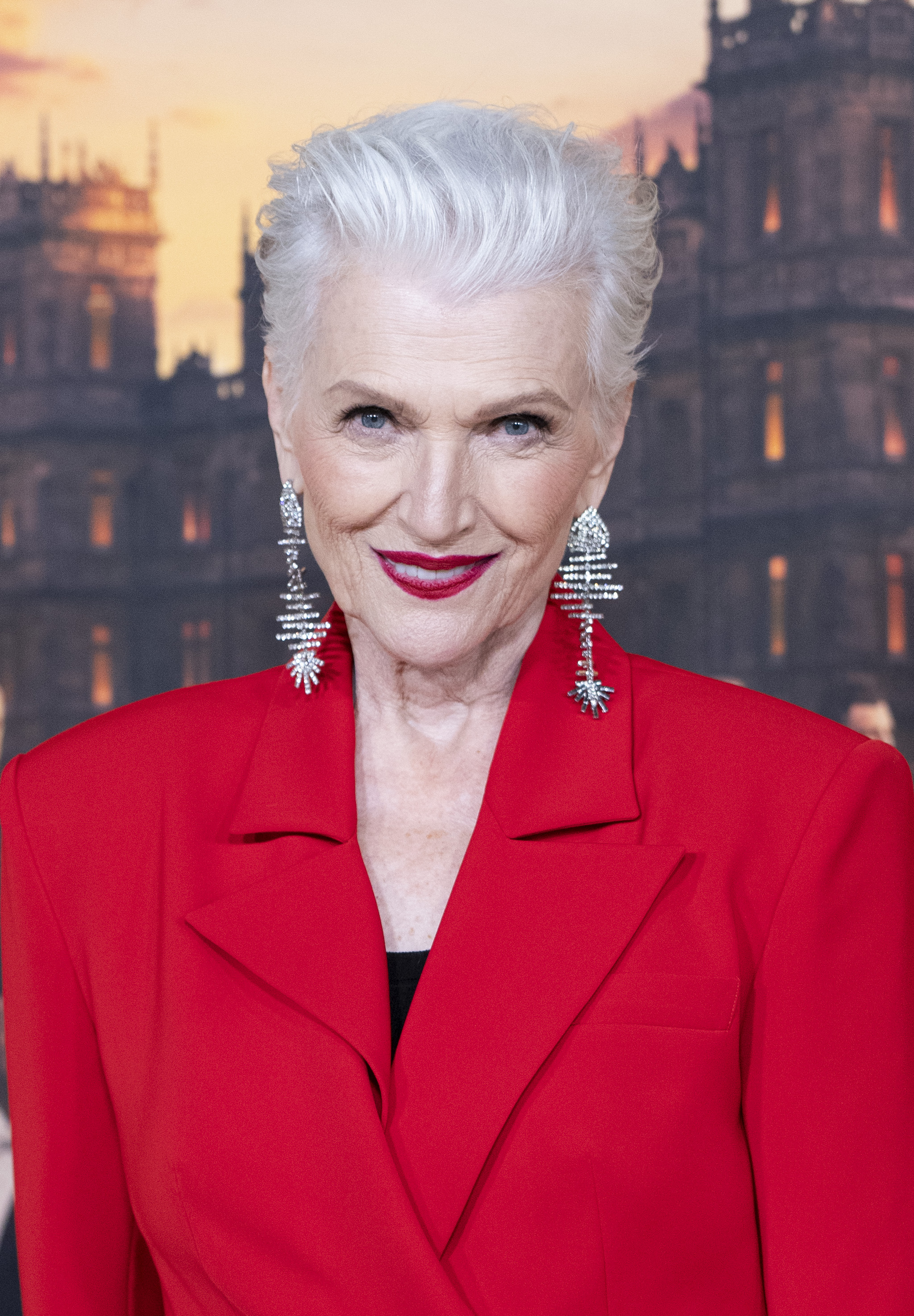
- Musk in 2025
- Born: Maye Haldeman; April 19, 1948 (age 78); Regina, Saskatchewan, Canada
- Citizenship: Canada; South Africa; United States
- Occupations: Model; dietitian; author
- Spouse: Errol Musk (m. 1970; div. 1979)
- Children: Elon; Kimbal; Tosca
- Parent(s): Joshua N. Haldeman (father); Winnifred Fletcher (mother)
- Relatives: Vivian Wilson (granddaughter); Lyndon Rive (nephew)
- Modeling information
- Agency: Creative Artists Agency

Maye Musk (née Haldeman; born April 19, 1948) is a model and dietitian. She is the mother of Elon Musk, Kimbal Musk and Tosca Musk. Born in Canada, she holds Canadian, South African and American citizenship.

== Early life and career ==
Maye Haldeman was born on April 19, 1948, in Regina, Saskatchewan, Canada, a twin and one of five children. Her grandfather, John Elon Haldeman, a Minnesotan, was descended from Swiss Anabaptists who immigrated to British America in the 1720s. Her parents were Winnifred Josephine "Wyn" (née Fletcher), a dance instructor from Moose Jaw, Saskatchewan, and Joshua Norman Haldeman, who was also born in Minnesota. Joshua was a Regina chiropractor, an amateur archaeologist and a former director of Technocracy Incorporated. The couple were adventurous: they moved the family to Pretoria, South Africa, in 1950 and flew around the world in a prop plane in 1952.

She has an older brother, Scott, born around 1942 in Canada, and a younger brother, Angkor Lee, born in 1955. Her twin sister Kaye is the mother of Russ Rive, who co-founded the Brazilian interactive media design company SuperUber in 2002 and SuperViz in 2018, and of the SolarCity co-founders Lyndon Rive and Peter Rive. For over 10 years, the family spent time roaming the Kalahari Desert in search of its fabled Lost City of the Kalahari. Their parents gave slide shows and talks about their journeys. "My parents were very famous, but they were never snobs," she said. Joshua Haldeman was a political activist who ran for the Canadian Parliament for the Social Credit Party of Canada, and headed the Canadian branch of the Technocracy movement.

As her parents were entrepreneurs, Haldeman started working at about 8 years of age, when she would "prepare her parents monthly bulletins and photocopy newsletters, and then put the stamps on the envelopes". By the age of 12, before and then after school, Haldeman worked as a receptionist alongside her twin sister for their father.

As a young woman, Haldeman was a finalist in the 1969 Miss South Africa beauty competition. In 1970, she married Errol Musk, a South African engineer she met in high school. They had three children: Elon Musk, Kimbal Musk, and Tosca Musk. She named Elon after her American grandfather, John Elon Haldeman (born in Illinois).

In 1979, she divorced Errol Musk. Two years later, Elon, who was about 10 at the time, decided to live with his father, as he had the Encyclopaedia Britannica and a computer, things which Maye could not afford to give the children as a single parent. Kimbal joined Elon four years later. After graduating from high school, Elon decided to move to Canada; in 1989, six months later, Maye moved to Canada with her daughter Tosca.

Maye earned a master's degree in dietetics from the University of the Orange Free State (now University of the Free State) in South Africa. Her major was taught in Afrikaans, one of the four languages Musk now speaks. She later earned another master's degree in nutritional science from the University of Toronto. In 2023, she was given an honorary degree, a doctorate of dietetics, from the University of the Free State, where she earned her master's degree.

== Later life ==
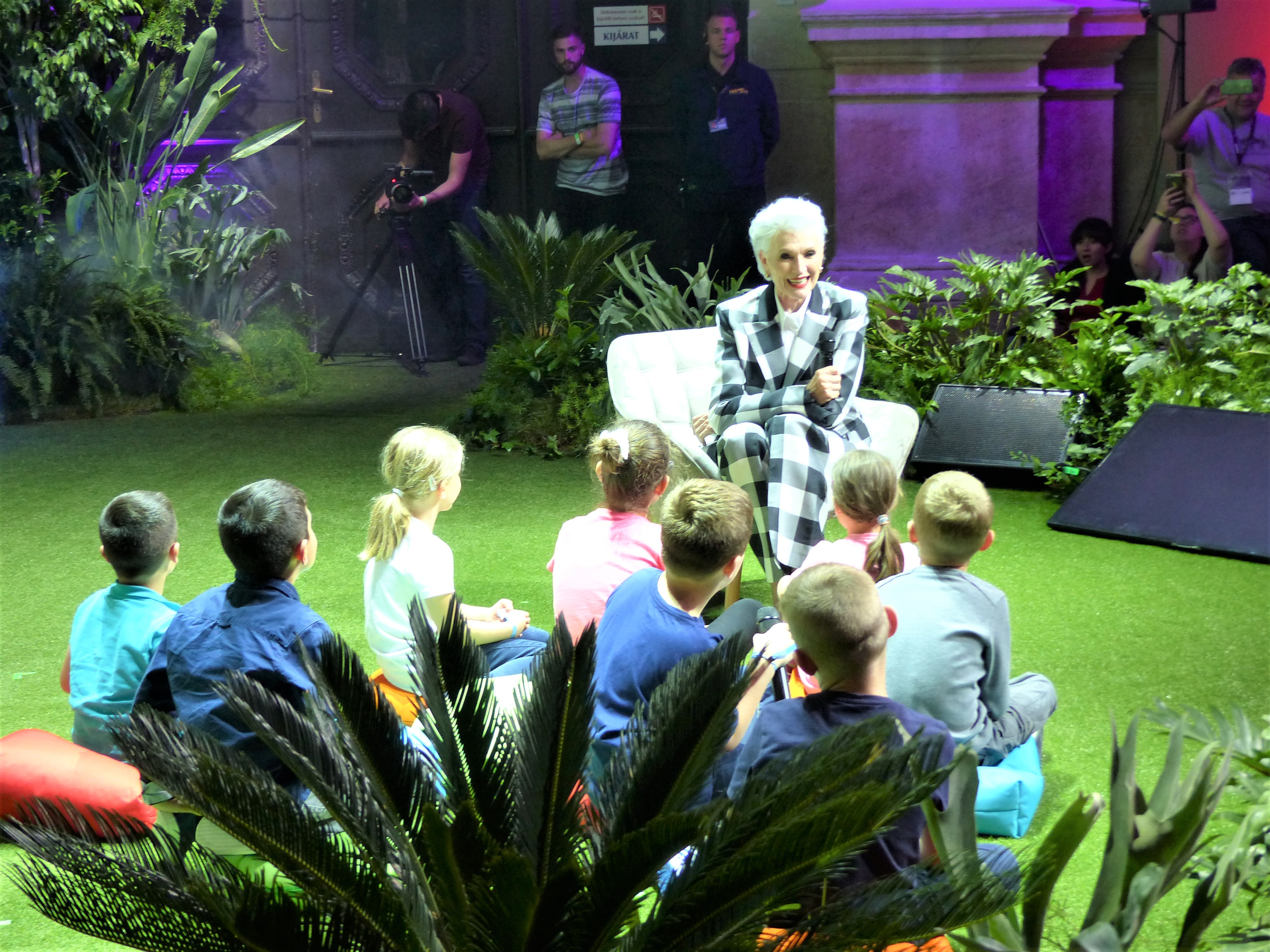
Maye Musk at Brain Bar 2019

Her modelling career continued in Canada and the United States. She has appeared on boxes of Special K cereal, in Revlon ads, and in a Beyoncé video ("Haunted"). She appeared nude on both the cover of Time magazine for a health issue and the cover of New York magazine in 2011, the latter with a fake pregnant belly. She was on the cover of Elle Canada in 2012, and starred in advertisement campaigns for Target and Virgin America. In September 2017, she became CoverGirl's oldest spokesmodel at age 69, which one news story reported as "making history". In 2022, at age 74, she was the oldest Sports Illustrated swimsuit model to date, appearing on the cover of the annual issue.

In addition to modelling, she has a business as a dietitian and gives presentations worldwide.

She wrote a memoir titled A Woman Makes a Plan: Advice for a Lifetime of Adventure, Beauty, and Success (2019). Maye had written Feel Fantastic – Maye Musk's Good Health Clinic, which was published in 1996. It enumerated healthy habits and lifestyle changes for healthy ageing.

In an interview with Forbes magazine, Musk said her greatest achievement was "having three great kids and surviving".

In 2021, she was one of the guests at Lady Kitty Spencer's wedding.

Maye Musk appeared alongside her son Elon on Saturday Night Live on May 8, 2021, the day before Mother's Day.

In April 2023, Musk received an honorary doctorate from the University of the Free State in South Africa for her work as a dietitian.

Since at least 2023, Maye Musk has developed a large following in China, where she has "star status" and is seen as a role model. She is on billboards, magazine covers, speaking events, and she represents at least five major Chinese brands in advertising. Her image "carries an element of successful parenting, attracting a significant number of mothers among her followers". Concerns have been raised in the US that she is so close to President Trump, through her son Elon, that she may be a security risk. The FBI normally scrutinizes the foreign contacts of presidential advisers and their family members before granting security clearances, but no such clearances are known to exist for Maye. There is no evidence that she has sought to influence US Government policy, according to a New York Times article from March 2025.

== Politics ==
When Maye Musk became an American citizen, she registered as Democrat. After unnamed Democrats allegedly spoke poorly of her son, Elon Musk, she changed her party affiliation to Republican, calling the Democratic Party "malicious and dishonest". In October 2024, Maye Musk made a post on X recommending Republican voters should be voting multiple times under false names in the 2024 presidential election, purporting that Democrats were already doing so using "illegals". She was cautioned by lawyers that her post constituted a criminal act, and that she could be legally prosecuted for criminal conspiracy if anyone followed her recommendation. She then said readers should "ignore" the post.
