= Ashlee Vance =

American journalist

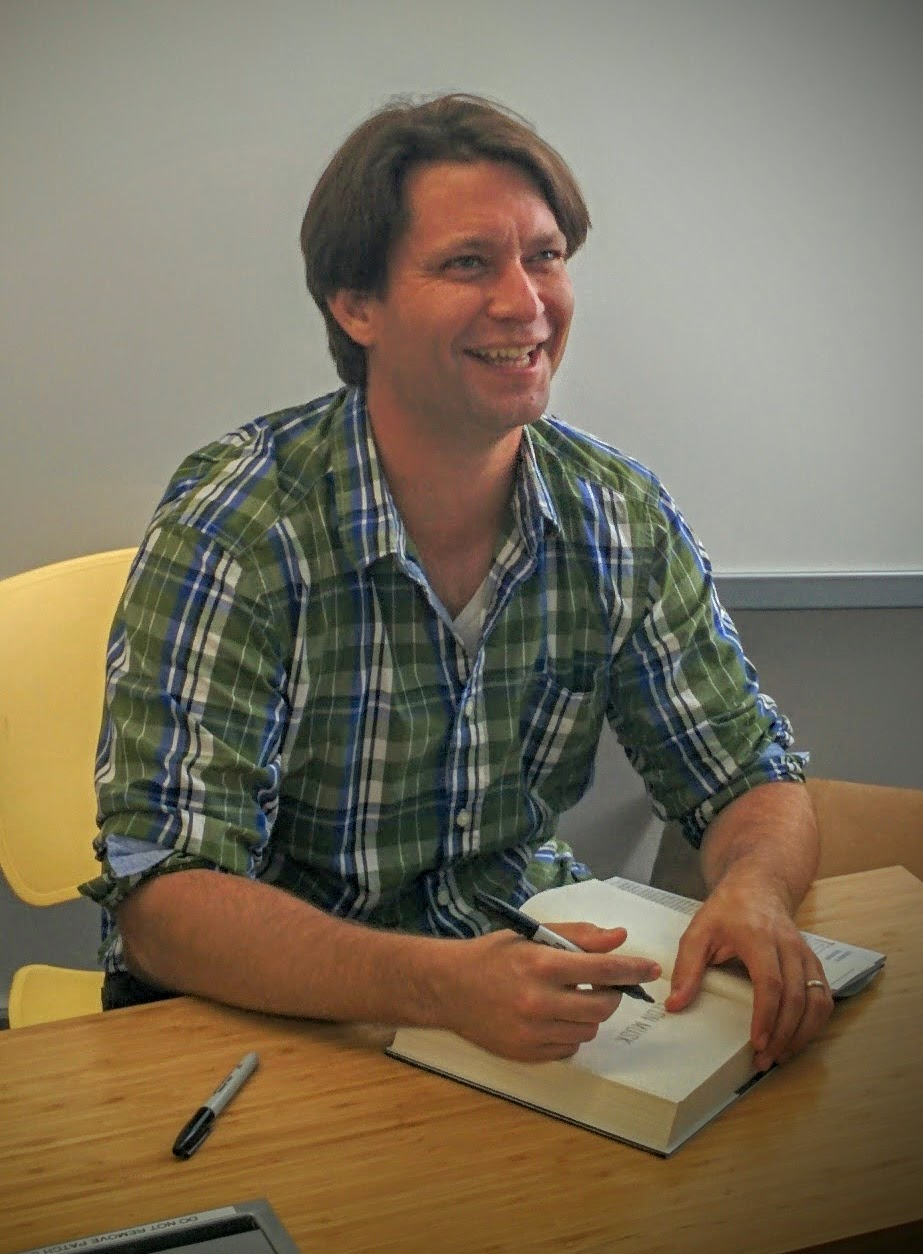
- Vance at a signing for his book, Elon Musk in 2015
- Born: South Africa
- Education: Pomona College, Claremont, California
- Writing career
- Subjects: Technology, business
- Notable work: Elon Musk: Tesla, SpaceX, and the Quest for a Fantastic Future
- Website: www.ashleevance.com

Ashlee Vance is an American reporter, writer, and filmmaker. He is known for his 2015 biography of Elon Musk, titled Elon Musk: Tesla, SpaceX, and the Quest for a Fantastic Future.

== Early life and education ==
Ashlee Vance was born in South Africa, and grew up mostly in the state of Texas in the United States.

He attended Pomona College in Claremont, California, graduating in 2000.

== Career ==
Vance wrote for The Register from March 2003 to August 2008. He moved to The New York Times in September 2008 and then to Bloomberg Businessweek in January 2011.

During his time at The Register, Vance covered companies such as IBM, HP, Intel, and Dell, and also wrote about a wide range of technology topics, including robots, Segway scooters, and the R programming language. In 2007, Vance wrote a book, called Geek Silicon Valley, on the history of Silicon Valley. His writing often also appeared in such publications as The Economist, Chicago Tribune, CNN.com, The Globe and Mail, the International Herald Tribune, and CNET.

Vance hosted an audio podcast called Semi-Coherent Computing from 2007 to 2008, in which he discussed enterprise computing topics such as data center cooling and blade servers, and interviewed guests including chip pioneer David Ditzel of Transmeta, Sun Microsystems, and Bell Labs.

In 2015, Vance started writing, producing and hosting the "Hello World" video series for Bloomberg, focusing on the tech scene in various countries. The show was nominated for an Emmy in 2016. In 2015, Vance published his biography about Elon Musk, the CEO of Tesla, SpaceX and other tech companies. The book became an immediate best-seller.

In late 2020, Vance was working on a TV series based on his Elon Musk book for HBO.

In May 2023, Vance published When the Heavens Went on Sale: The Misfits and Geniuses Racing to Put Space within Reach about the rise of commercial space. The book focused on Planet Labs, Rocket Lab, Astra Space and Firefly Aerospace. It became an immediate best-seller. A documentary inspired by the book, Wild Wild Space was released in July 2024, by HBO. In 2025, Vance was also credited as a producer on the Netflix documentary Don't Die: The Man Who Wants to Live Forever.

At the beginning of 2025, Vance left Bloomberg to found Core Memory, a new digital media company focused on science and technology. Core Memory has a YouTube show, a podcast, and a Substack newsletter, but also aims to produce production-quality documentaries, the first of which is on brain-computer interfaces and was in production as of January, 2025. He is also working on a book on OpenAI, for which he says he has already sold the movie rights.

== Personal life ==
Vance lives in California with his wife and their two children.

== Works ==
- Vance, Ashlee (2007). Geek Silicon Valley: The Inside Guide To Palo Alto, Stanford, Menlo Park, Mountain View, Santa Clara, Sunnyvale, San Jose, San Francisco. Globe Pequot. ISBN 978-0762742394.
- Vance, Ashlee (2015). Elon Musk: Tesla, SpaceX, and the Quest for a Fantastic Future. Harper. ISBN 978-0062301239.
- Vance, Ashlee (2023). When the Heavens Went on Sale: The Misfits and Geniuses Racing to Put Space Within Reach. Ecco. ISBN 978-0-06-299887-3.
