= Big Green (non-profit company) =

American nonprofit urging school gardens

- Established: 22 February 2011 (15 years ago)
- Types: nonprofit organization
- Legal status: 501(c)(3) organization
- Headquarters: Broomfield
- Country: United States
- Revenue: 6,047,457 United States dollar (2020)
- Total Assets: 4,759,958 United States dollar (2020)
- Website: biggreen.org

Big Green is a 501(c)(3) nonprofit organization founded in 2011 by Kimbal Musk and Hugo Matheson.

== History ==
Big Green was established in 2011 by Kimbal Musk and Hugo Matheson, with the goal of enhancing mindfulness about health and improving communities through the creation of practical, garden-based education opportunities.

The first learning garden was constructed in Denver, Colorado, at Schmitt Elementary in 2011. Originally named "The Kitchen Community", the organization's name changed to Big Green in 2018.

In 2021, the organization changed its business model from maintaining community gardens and teaching students to dispersing grants.

In 2023, the organization launched a cross-country "Grow Together" bus tour.

=== Learning gardens ===
A “learning garden” is an outdoor classroom that also serves as a productive garden of edible plants. It is composed of modular, raised beds with seating and shade, providing space for teaching and learning. The gardens are designed to become vehicles for comprehensive mindset change regarding child nourishment, socialization and student achievement. They are also designed to go well with any type of school structure, whether urban or rural.

The food harvested from the learning gardens are sold to restaurants. The activity aims to teach students to become young entrepreneurs and acquire business abilities.

In 2018, Big Green build learning gardens in 100 schools in the metro Detroit area.

== Controversy ==
Big Green has been accused of illegally discriminating against and firing employees who were unionizing. Ten workers who lost their jobs in 2021 settled with Big Green for $449,999 in back pay, benefits and wages, in September 2024. According to the case, the organization "threatened employees with discipline and termination for engaging in union activities" in July 2021.All 10 employees were offered reinstation by the company; two accepted, according to a court motion.
