= Lost City of the Kalahari =

Historical mystery

The Lost City of the Kalahari is a historical mystery of exploration and archaeology dating to the end of the 19th century. History reports the existence of a ruined city found in the Kalahari Desert in southern Africa.

== Origin of the mystery ==
In 1885, the Canadian Guillermo Farini (pseudonym of William Leonard Hunt) was one of the first Westerners to cross the unexplored portion of the Kalahari. On his return to Europe, he published a book detailing his experiences which included descriptions of unusual rock formations that he believed to be ruins of hitherto unknown buildings. Farini subsequently presented a paper to the Royal Geographical Society (it was read in his absence) and photographs taken on the expedition were publicly exhibited, increasing his notoriety and that of his journey.

In his book Farini describes the ruins as

A half-buried ruin - a huge wreck of stones
On a lone and desolate spot;
A temple - or a tomb for human bones
Left by men to decay and rot.

Rude sculptured blocks from the red sand project,
And shapeless uncouth stones appear,
Some great man's ashes designed to protect,
Buried many a thousand year.

A relic, may be, of a glorious past,
A city once grand and sublime,
Destroyed by earthquake, defaced by the blast,
Swept away by the hand of time.

== The legends and the search ==
At the start of the 20th century, Farini's observation gave birth to a legend throughout South Africa. Some people claimed to have seen an abandoned boat or even a stone quarry in the empty desert. Others attempted to explain the presence of this unknown civilization with comparisons to archaeological finds at Great Zimbabwe.

In 1932, twenty-five expeditions were launched to find the Lost City. They crisscrossed the desert area in the direction of Farini. F. R. Paver and Dr. W. M. Borcherds headed out from Upington to search the desert sands, flying over the area in reconnaissance aircraft and subsequently suggesting a number of explanations. However, they failed to find any signs of construction in the area.

Additional airplane searches were conducted by Joshua N. Haldeman.

== A possible solution to the mystery ==
A. J. Clement researched the story in 1964 and advanced a new theory. Clement claimed his study of Farini's description of his route highlighted inconsistencies in Farini's story. Clement concluded that Farini went deep into Southern Africa, but he never actually went to the heart of the Kalahari where he claimed the Lost City was sited. To test this premise, Clement explored what he regarded as Farini's true route and discovered a set of monumental rocks, resembling walls.

Clement concluded that Farini's 'lost city' was shown to exist but as a natural formation. Clement had found a geological curiosity, dating back 180 million years to the great upheaval accompanying the birth of the Drakensberg Mountains in South Africa.

The stones are composed of dolerite, a particular type of igneous rock which can erode to give the appearance of straight and regular blocks suggesting artificial construction.

== Gallery ==
A selection of photos from the expedition
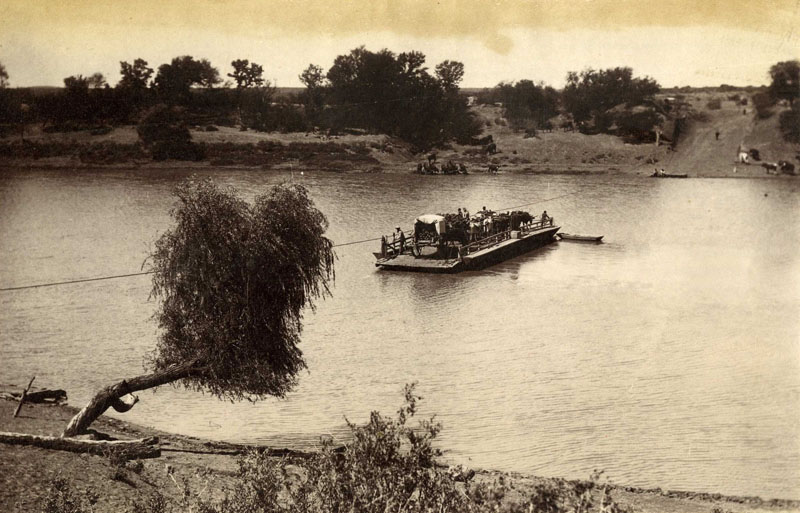
Wire pont ferry, Vaal River

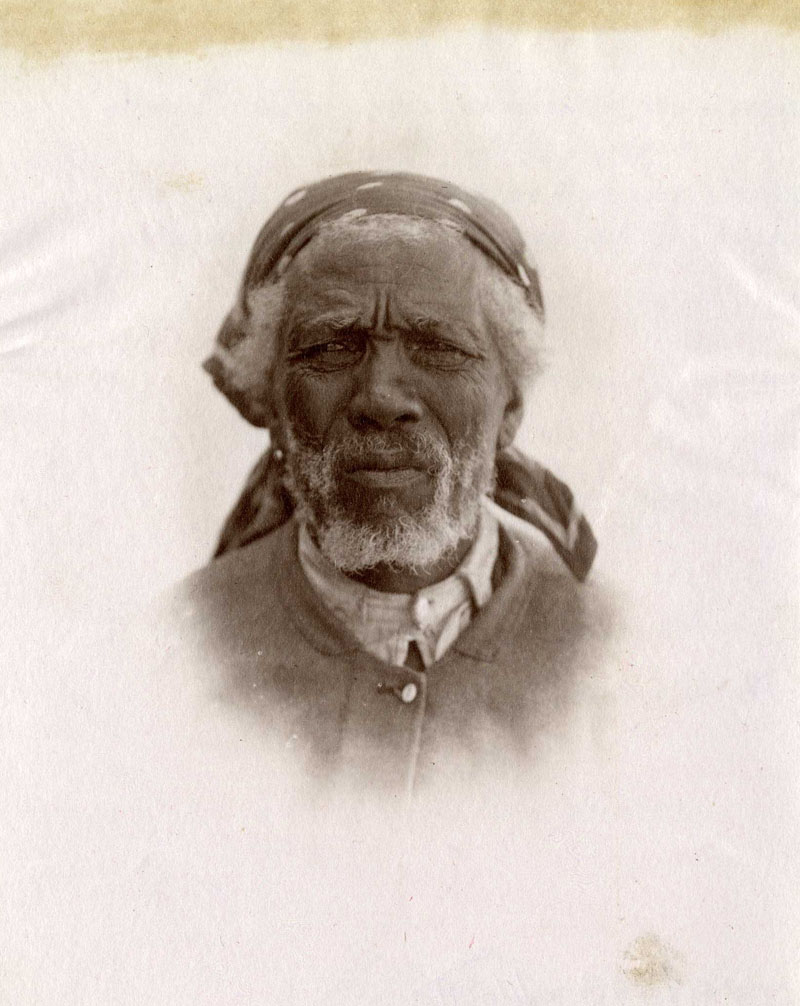
Captain Derek Veelander, Kalahari

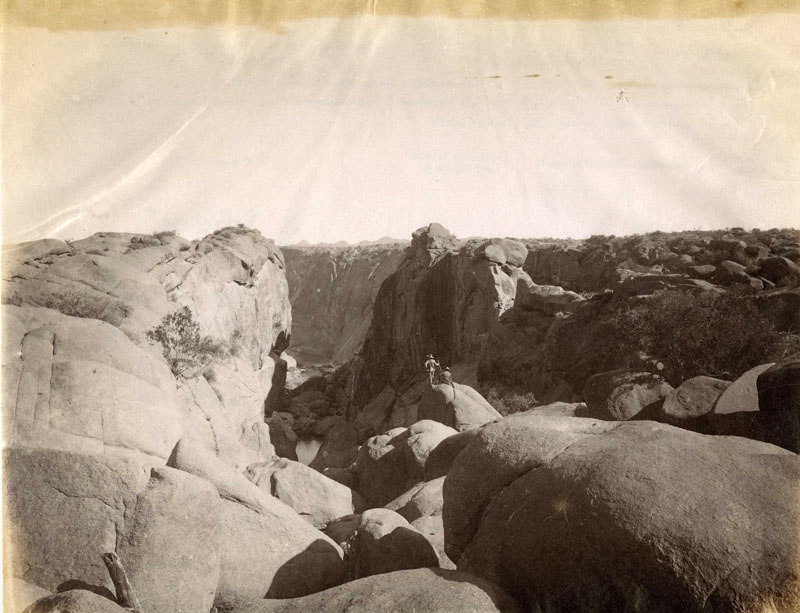
Schernbrueker Gorge of The Hundred Falls, Orange River

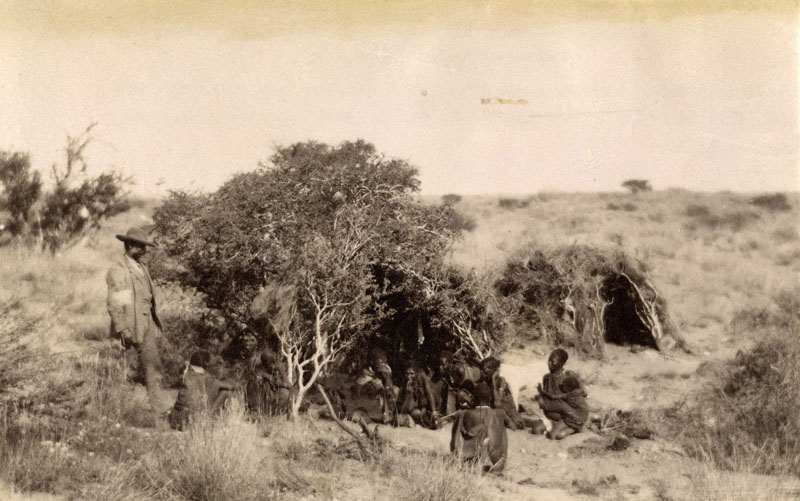
Kattea encampment, Kalahari Desert

== In popular culture ==
Josh Gates visits the Clement walls in Expedition Unknown, along with a number of smaller sites containing man-made walls, roads, and carvings.
