= Errol Musk =

South African businessman and politician (born 1946)

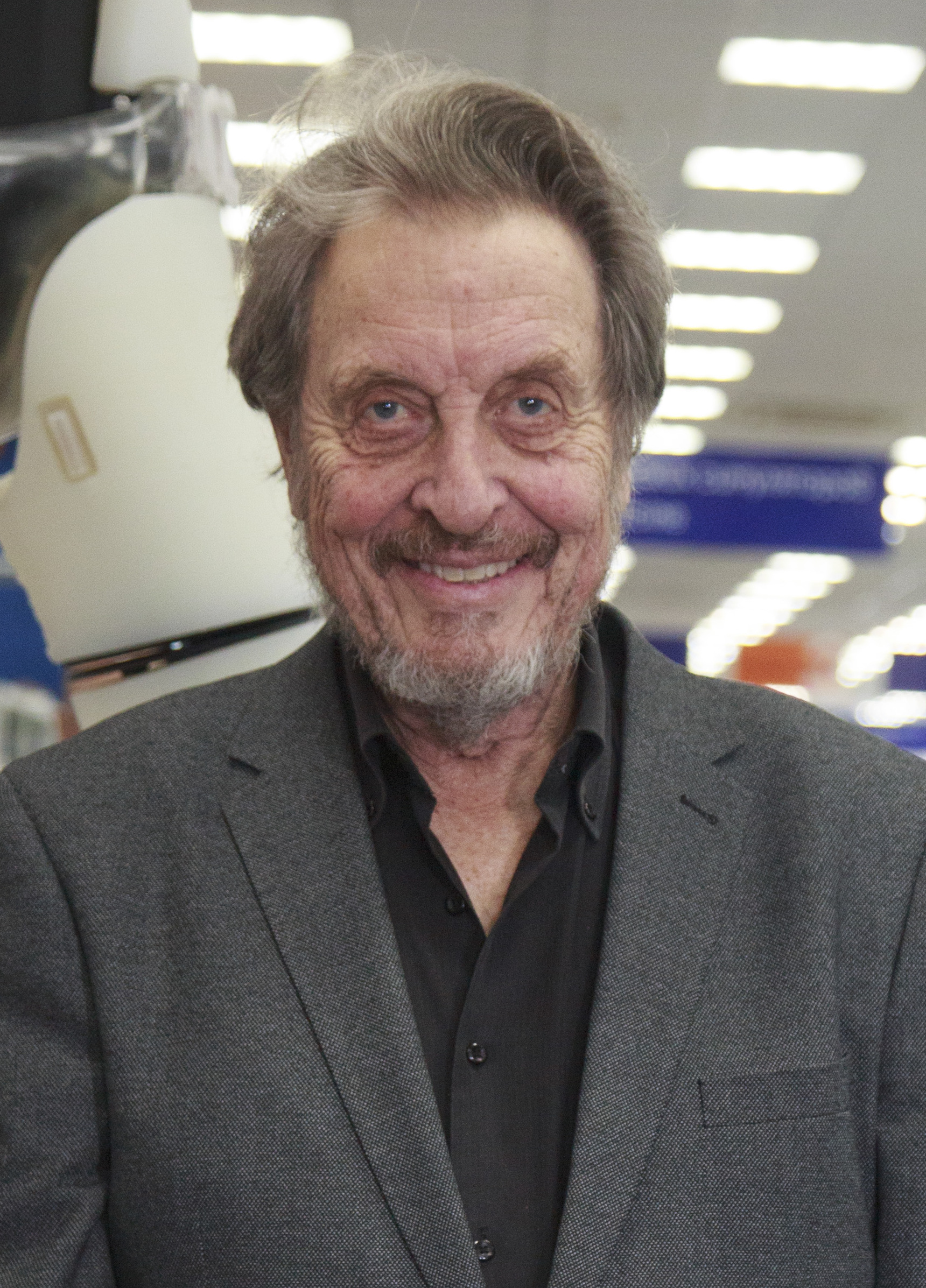
- Musk in 2025

Member of Pretoria City Council
- In office 1972–1983

Personal details
- Born: Errol Graham Musk; 25 May 1946 (age 80) Pretoria, Transvaal, (Note: Now Gauteng) Union of South Africa
- Party: Independent (1972–1980); Progressive Federal Party (1980–1983)
- Spouse(s): Maye Haldeman (m. 1970; div. 1979) Sue Musk (divorced) Heide Bezuidenhout (m. 1992; div. 2004)
- Domestic partner: Jana Bezuidenhout
- Children: 7, including Elon, Kimbal, and Tosca
- Education: University of Pretoria
- Errol Musk's voice Errol Musk speaks on the Rivonia Trial. Recorded on 12 May 2025

Errol Graham Musk (born 25 May 1946) is a South African businessman and politician who is the patriarch of the Musk family. He was a member of Pretoria City Council from 1972 to 1983, initially as an independent and then as a member of the Progressive Federal Party from 1980. As a businessman, he has worked as a mechanical engineering consultant, developed properties, and invested in various ventures including emerald trading. He is the father of Elon Musk, the wealthiest person in the world since 2025.

Musk married Maye Haldeman in 1970, and they had three children: Elon, Kimbal and Tosca. They divorced in 1979; Maye later described the marriage as abusive. He has since had four other children, two with his second wife, Heide Bezuidenhout, and two with her daughter Jana.

== Early life ==
Errol Graham Musk was born on 25 May 1946 in Pretoria, in the Transvaal province of the Union of South Africa, to Walter Henry James Musk and Cora Amelia Musk (née Robinson). His father was a South African Second World War veteran, and his mother was born in Liverpool, England.

Musk attended Clapham High School in Queenswood, where he began a relationship with Maye Haldeman, whom he married in 1970. The family lived in Pretoria, where Maye worked as a dietitian and model. Their first child, Elon Reeve Musk, was born on 28 June 1971, named after Maye's grandfather J. Elon Haldeman, with Reeve being her maternal grandmother's maiden name. Errol Musk served in the Burgermag for 11 years, where he later claimed to have reached the rank of officer before retiring in 1975.

== Career ==
On 9 March 1972, Musk was elected as an independent to represent Sunnyside on Pretoria City Council. In 1980 he became a member of the Progressive Federal Party, the new official opposition formed in 1977, and ran as their Sunnyside nominee in the 1981 election. In 1983 his resignation from the PFP over its stance towards the constitutional referendum was front-page news for the ruling National Party's organ Die Burger, which portrayed the opposition as divided. Musk rebelled against the PFP's call for rejecting the new constitution and cited his agreement with the New Republic Party's position that the Tricameral Parliament was a step in the right direction.

Musk worked as an electrical and mechanical engineering consultant and developed properties. He later owned an auto-parts store and a share in an emerald mine. Maye has said that the family owned two homes, a plane, a yacht and a handful of luxury cars.

In the early 1980s, Errol built a lodge in the Timbavati Game Reserve to rent to tourists.

According to Walter Isaacson's 2023 biography of Elon, in 1986 Errol sold a plane in exchange for a portion of the emeralds produced at three small mines in Zambia, without owning a stake in the mines; he told Isaacson the operation was not registered because "if you registered it, you would wind up with nothing, because the blacks would take everything from you", adding that he was not racist. In a 2018 interview with Business Insider, he said he owned a half share in a Zambian emerald mine and that "we had so much money at times we couldn't even close our safe". Snopes found earlier reporting that he had at some point owned "a stake in an emerald mine" near Lake Tanganyika, but no evidence that the money helped Elon build his wealth.

According to the 2015 biography of Elon Musk, Elon Musk: Tesla, SpaceX, and the Quest for a Fantastic Future, in 1995 Errol Musk gave US$28,000 to Elon and Kimbal as they were starting up the software company Zip2. Elon has denied receiving the money from his father.

According to Rolling Stone, Musk shot and killed three of five burglars who tried to break into his home; he has said he was cleared of all charges on the grounds of self-defence.

In a January 2025 video interview, Musk stated that governance in South Africa has deteriorated.

In January 2025, Musk endorsed a meme coin called "Musk It" and revealed that he planned to raise $200 million for the Musk Institute via this project.

In February 2025, Musk arranged a phone call between his son Elon and Cyril Ramaphosa, during which the two discussed the impact of Donald Trump's policies on South Africa. In April 2025, Errol praised Vladimir Putin in an interview with BBC News Russian. He said "it would be foolish not to admire Putin." He also implied Russia was not responsible for the war in Ukraine, and claimed his entire family supported Putin.

In June 2025, Musk visited the Ram Mandir in Ayodhya, India, with his daughter Alexandra, calling it "one of the best things I’ve ever done." He was also named Global Advisor to the Indian company Servotech Power Systems and took part in green energy initiatives during his visit. Also in June 2025, Musk participated as a speaker at the Forum of the Future 2050 in Moscow, a conference organised by the Russian television channel Tsargrad and its chairman Konstantin Malofeev; the guests also included the Russian foreign minister Sergey Lavrov, the economist Jeffrey Sachs and the radio host Alex Jones.

In November 2025, during an interview on CNN with Donie O'Sullivan in a documentary about a supposed white genocide in South Africa, Musk expressed his opinion that the United States is "doomed" because it will have a majority non-white population within the next 20 years, proclaiming "You want to go back to the jungle?". Musk also denied that blacks were oppressed during the apartheid era in South Africa and credited whites with "feeding" the black population and giving them work.

== Family life ==
In 1979, Musk and his wife Maye divorced. In her memoir, Maye characterised her marriage as abusive and alleged Errol had been violent. She recounts a time during their divorce when she sought refuge at a neighbour's home after Errol showed up with a knife looking for her. After the divorce, Musk repeatedly sued his ex-wife for custody of their children. He was briefly married to a woman named Sue.

In the early 1990s, Musk, then aged 45, married Heide Bezuidenhout, a 25-year-old he described as "one of the best-looking women I've ever seen in my life." He had two daughters with Bezuidenhout.

In March 2018, it was reported that Musk had fathered a child with his adult step-daughter, Heide's daughter Jana Bezuidenhout. In July 2022, he gave an interview to the tabloid newspaper The Sun, announcing that he and Jana Bezuidenhout had another child. Musk has a total of seven children, according to People magazine in November 2022. He once commented, "The only thing we are on Earth for is to reproduce."

In 2022, Musk stated he was "not proud" of Elon. In 2024, he defended Elon after the latter said that the United Kingdom was heading towards a civil war. In January 2025, he defended Elon's remarks but also urged people to ignore them.

In September 2025, The New York Times published an article alleging that "a significant factor in Elon Musk's rupture with his father stems from accusations against Errol Musk of child sexual abuse." The earliest accusation of abuse came in 1993, when Musk's stepdaughter told relatives that he had touched her inappropriately.
