= Carol Muske-Dukes =

American writer

- Born: Carol Muske; 1945 (age 80–81); Saint Paul, Minnesota, U.S.
- Education: Creighton University (BA); San Francisco State University (MA)
- Spouse: David Dukes
- Children: 1

Carol Muske-Dukes (born 1945 in Saint Paul, Minnesota) is an American poet, novelist, essayist, critic, and professor, and the former poet laureate of California (2008–2011). Her most recent book of poetry, Sparrow (Random House, 2003), chronicling the love and loss of Muske-Dukes’ late husband, actor David Dukes, was a National Book Award finalist.

== Life ==
Muske-Dukes grew up in Forest Lake, Minnesota. She received B.A. English from Creighton University in 1967, and her M.A. in 1970 from San Francisco State University. She has taught in the graduate writing programs at Columbia University, the Iowa Writers' Workshop, the University of California, Irvine, and the University of Virginia. She is one of the founding members of the USC PhD in Creative Writing & Literature, where she currently teaches.

She has a daughter, who graduated from USC in May 2005, and she is the widow of actor David Dukes, who died in 2000.

In addition to her seven books of poetry, she has published four novels, the most recent of which, Channeling Mark Twain (2007), is about a woman poet who teaches poetry at a women's detention facility, just as the author herself did and the perspectives she gains from the poetry her students write. Her work has appeared in Antaeus, Ploughshares, Paris Review, and The New Yorker.

== Awards ==
- 1979 Alice Fay Di Castagnola Award of the Poetry Society of America
- 1981 Guggenheim Fellowship
- 1999 Witter Bynner Fellowship
- National Endowment for the Arts Fellowship in Poetry
- Ingram Merrill grant

== Published works ==
Poetry collections

- Camouflage: Poems. University of Pittsburgh Press. 1975. ISBN 9780822952596.
- Skylight. Doubleday. 1981. ISBN 9780385170871.
- Wyndmere: Poems. University of Pittsburgh Press. 1985. ISBN 978-0-8229-3503-2.
- Applause. University of Pittsburgh Press. 1989. ISBN 978-0-8229-3613-8.
- Red Trousseau. Viking. 1993. ISBN 978-0-670-84508-8.
- Octave Above Thunder: New and Selected Poems. Tandem Library. 1997. ISBN 978-1-4177-0418-7.
- Sparrow: Poems. Random House, Inc. 2004. ISBN 978-0-8129-6748-7.
- Twin Cities. Penguin Books. May 31, 2011
- Blue Rose. Penguin Books. April 3, 2018

Collaborative works

- Rendezvous with Light: A Collection of Poetry and Photographs. Figueroa Press. 2006. ISBN 978-193280013-5.

Novels

- Dear Digby. Viking. 1989. ISBN 978-0-670-82506-6.
- Saving St. Germ. Viking. 1993. ISBN 978-0-670-84047-2.
- Life After Death: A Novel. Random House. 2001. ISBN 978-0-375-50515-7.
- Channeling Mark Twain. Random House, Inc. 2008. ISBN 978-0-8129-6749-4.

Essay collections

- Women & Poetry: Truth, Autobiography, and the Shape of the Self (University of Michigan Press, 1997)
- Married to the Icepick Killer: A Poet in Hollywood. Random House. 2002. ISBN 978-0-375-50711-3.

Anthologies

- Michael Collier; Stanley Plumly, eds. (1999). "Oblique Muscle". Title The New Bread Loaf Anthology of Contemporary American Poetry. UPNE. ISBN 978-0-87451-950-1.
- David Lehman; Robert Hass, eds. (2001). The Best American Poetry 2001. Scribner poetry. ISBN 978-0-7432-0383-8.
- Billy Collins, ed. (2005). "Passport: A Manifesto". 180 more: extraordinary poems for every day. Random House, Inc. ISBN 978-0-8129-7296-2.
- David Walker, ed. (2006). American Alphabets: 25 Contemporary Poets. Oberlin College Press. ISBN 978-0-932440-28-0.

== Sources ==
- Library of Congress Online Catalog : Carol Muske-Dukes
- National Book Foundation : 2003 National Book Award Finalist: Poetry : Carol Muske-Dukes
