= Kimbal Musk =

Entrepreneur (born 1972)

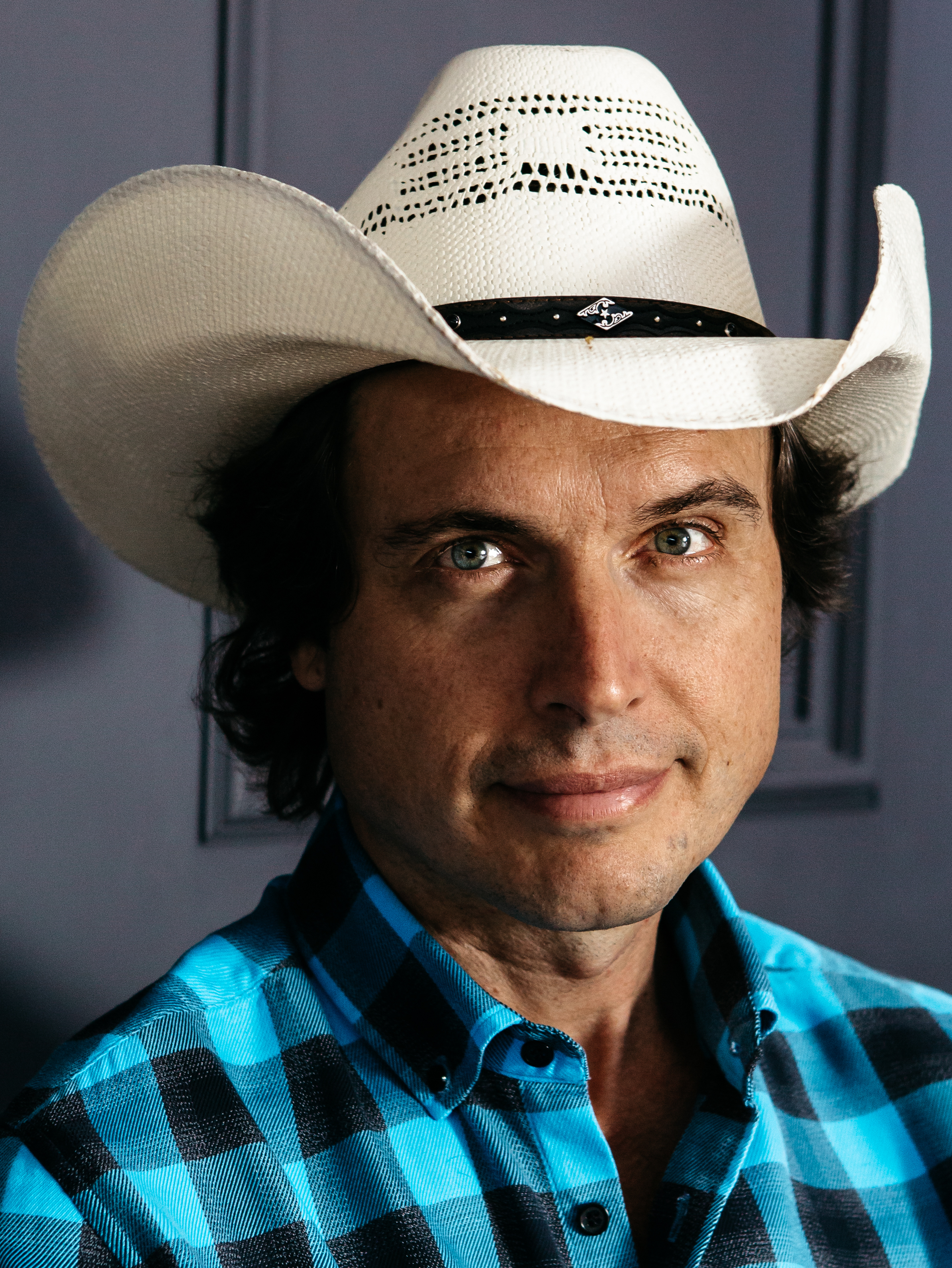
- Musk in 2013
- Born: Kimbal James Musk; 20 September 1972 (age 54); Pretoria, South Africa
- Education: Queen's University
- Occupations: Chef; businessman; environmentalist; venture capitalist
- Spouses: Jen Lewin (m. 2001; div. 2010); Christiana Wyly (m. 2018)
- Children: 3
- Parents: Errol Musk (father); Maye Musk (mother)
- Relatives: Musk family

Kimbal James Musk (born 20 September 1972) is a South African-born venture capitalist and restaurateur. He co-owns The Kitchen Restaurant Group, with restaurants in Colorado, Chicago, and Austin. He is the co-founder and chairman of Big Green, a 501(c)(3) nonprofit that has built hundreds of outdoor classrooms called Learning Gardens in schoolyards across the United States. Musk is also the co-founder and chairman of Square Roots, an urban farming company growing food in hydroponic, indoor, climate controlled shipping containers. Musk sits on the boards of Tesla Inc. and SpaceX, of which his older brother Elon is the CEO. He was on the board of Chipotle Mexican Grill from 2013 to 2019. He is the brother of Elon Musk and Tosca Musk, the son of Errol and Maye Musk, and a major shareholder in Tesla. Musk's net worth is estimated to be $1.6 billion by Forbes as of November 2026.

In 1995 he co-founded the software company Zip2 with Elon, which was acquired by Compaq for $307 million in 1999.

== Early life ==
Musk grew up with his older brother Elon, younger sister Tosca, and many cousins. His mother, Maye Musk (née Haldeman), is a model and dietitian born in Saskatchewan, Canada, and raised in South Africa. His father, Errol Musk, is a South African electromechanical engineer, pilot, sailor, consultant, emerald dealer, and property developer, who partly owned a rental lodge at the Timbavati Private Nature Reserve. After finishing high school in Pretoria, South Africa, Musk left to meet his brother in Kingston, Ontario, Canada, and enrolled at Queen's University to pursue a degree in business. While in school, Musk first worked at Scotiabank. He graduated with his degree from Queen's University in 1995.

== Business career ==
Musk's first venture was a residential painting business with College Pro Painters in 1994, the same year he and his elder brother, Elon, started their second company, Zip2. Zip2 was an online city guide that provided content for the new online versions of The New York Times and the Chicago Tribune newspapers. The company was sold in 1999 to Compaq for $307 million.

After selling Zip2, Musk invested in several young software and technology companies. Musk was an early investor in his brother's venture X.com, an online financial services and email payments company. X.com merged with competitor Confinity to form PayPal, which in October 2002 was acquired by eBay for $1.5 billion in stock.

From 2006 to 2011, Musk served as the CEO of OneRiot, an advertising network. In September 2011, Walmart-Labs acquired OneRiot for an undisclosed purchase price.

On 9 February 2021, Musk sold 30,000 shares of Tesla, Inc. worth $25.6 million. On 24 February 2022, it was reported that the SEC was investigating Musk for possible insider trading violations after he sold 88,500 shares of Tesla, valued at $108 million, one day before his brother put out a poll on Twitter asking if he should sell 10% of his Tesla shares. As a result of that poll, Elon Musk sold billions of dollars of Tesla shares and the stock price sank.

In 2022, Kimbal Musk became an entrepreneur in multi-drone coordinated aerial displays. Through the holding company Nova Displays he bought the Intel multi-drone coordinated aerial displays subsidiary and nine thousand drones.

=== Restaurateur ===
While Elon stayed in California, Kimbal moved to New York and enrolled into the French Culinary Institute in New York City. In April 2004, Musk opened The Kitchen, a community bistro in Boulder, Colorado with Jen Lewin and Hugo Matheson. In addition to its flagship restaurant in Boulder, The Kitchen has locations in downtown Denver and Chicago.

In 2011, Next Door American Eatery opened in downtown Boulder as a fast casual American eatery. Next Door American Eatery is a growing restaurant concept with ten locations as of 2019.

After seven years of supporting the Growe Foundation to plant school gardens in the Boulder community, in 2011 Musk and Matheson established Big Green (originally named The Kitchen Community), a 501c3 nonprofit to help connect kids to real food by creating dynamic Learning Garden classrooms in schools across America. Learning Gardens teach children an understanding of food, healthy eating, lifestyle choices and environment through lesson plans and activities that tie into existing school curriculum, such as math, science, and literacy.

Each of The Kitchen restaurants donates a percentage of sales to help plant Learning Gardens in its local community. In 2012, Big Green built 26 gardens in Colorado, 16 in Chicago, and 12 more around the United States.

In December 2012, Chicago Mayor Rahm Emanuel handed Musk's nonprofit $1 million to install 80 Learning Gardens in Chicago city schools. On 2 February 2015, The Kitchen Community celebrated its 200th Learning Garden build at Camino Nuevo Charter Academy, a high school in Los Angeles Unified School District which also marked the District's first SEEDS Project.

By the end of 2015, four years after its founding, The Kitchen Community had built 260 Learning Gardens across Chicago, Denver, Los Angeles and Memphis. In 2016, Musk co-founded Square Roots, an urban farming company that grows organic food in shipping containers. The company formed a partnership with Gordon Food Services (GFS) to expand outside of NYC. In January 2018, The Kitchen Community (TKC), expanded into a national nonprofit called Big Green and announced its seventh city, Detroit, to build outdoor Learning Garden classrooms in 100 schools across the Motor City. As of 2019, Big Green is in seven American cities with nearly 600 schools across its network impacting over 300,000 students every day. Musk and Big Green have established Plant a Seed Day, an international holiday.

==== The Family Fund ====
Kimbal Musk's restaurant group collected funds (called the Family Fund) from employees to cover hardships and personal emergencies, but during the coronavirus pandemic of 2020, the restaurants closed "permanently" and the employees were locked out of the funds they had contributed to. Later, the restaurants reopened but reportedly did not restore the fund to those who contributed. Musk later disputed reports of the controversy, citing lack of facts by journalists. The Kitchen Restaurant Group reports the fund now receives contributions from owners and customers; as tips for take-out orders are rerouted to the fund and then matched by the owners. The group also reports that grants have been awarded and both furloughed and laid-off workers will be considered in future.

== Personal life ==
Musk married Jen Lewin, with whom he established The Kitchen. The couple had two children together. They later divorced. He lives in Boulder, Colorado. In April 2018, he married Christiana Wyly, an environmental activist and the daughter of ex-billionaire Sam Wyly. Musk also has a daughter from another relationship. One of his children is transgender.

In February 2010 Musk broke his neck while inner tubing, resulting in temporary paralysis that lasted for three days until it was resolved with surgery.

Musk was named a Global Social Entrepreneur of the Year 2018 by the World Economic Forum.

=== Jeffrey Epstein connection ===
Musk was reported to have dated a woman in Jeffrey Epstein's inner circle who was the ex-girlfriend of the deceased financier and sex offender. Musk was allegedly set up with the woman by Epstein in an attempt to build a connection with the Musk family. Musk first began socializing with Epstein in 2012, years after Epstein's 2008 conviction. He would later be invited to Epstein's private island in 2013, although there are no records that Musk visited the island. According to documents released by the U.S. Department of Justice as part of the Epstein files investigation, Musk is referenced more than 140 times in emails exchanged between Jeffrey Epstein, his associates, and Musk himself.

Following criticism from artists and attendees of Burning Man over Musk's ties to Epstein, Musk resigned from his board role with the Burning Man Project in 2026, a position he had held since 2021.
