= Views of Elon Musk =

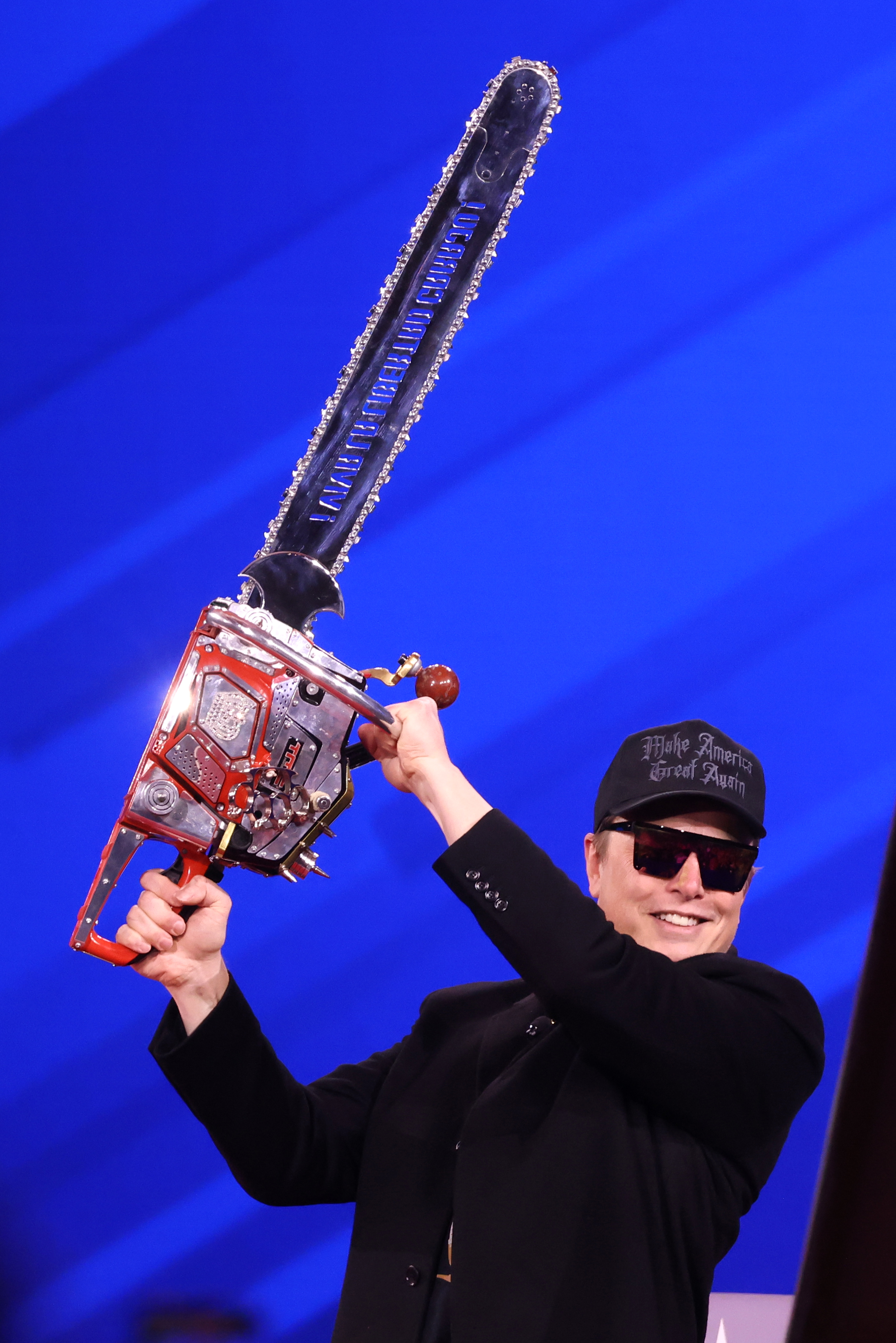
Musk wielding a chainsaw with "¡Viva la libertad, carajo!" engraved on it at the 2025 Conservative Political Action Conference (CPAC)

Elon Musk is a businessman and entrepreneur known for his leadership of Tesla, SpaceX, X (formerly Twitter), and xAI. He is the wealthiest individual in the world, and a former U.S. government employee.

Despite rejecting the conservative label and describing himself as a political moderate, Musk's views have become increasingly right-wing over time, leading them to be characterized as far-right and libertarian authoritarian. (Note: In addition to far-right, as well as libertarian authoritarian, Musk has been described as right wing, libertarian, and associated with techno-libertarians.)

As the owner of Twitter, he has been accused of suppressing critics and allowing the spread of misinformation. Following his involvement in European politics, Musk’s public statements have received criticism from several world leaders. He frequently comments on topics ranging from science and technology to religion and philosophy.

Within the context of American politics, Musk voted for Democratic candidates from 2008 before switching to Republican candidates in 2022 and supporting Donald Trump in 2024, with whom he had previously feuded. He identifies as a "free speech absolutist" and has expressed support for universal basic income, gun rights, a carbon tax, and H-1B visas. Conversely, he has criticized the wealth tax, short-selling, government subsidies, and Wikipedia. Musk has voiced concern about the perceived dangers of artificial intelligence and climate change, while also opposing public transportation systems, rejecting labor unions, and promoting pronatalism.

During the COVID-19 pandemic in 2020, Musk defied lockdown orders, calling them "fascist", supported the Canada convoy protest against vaccine mandates, and made several contentious epidemiological claims. He has promoted conspiracy theories and made controversial statements that have led to accusations of racism, sexism, antisemitism, Islamophobia, transphobia, and spreading misinformation and disinformation.

While describing himself as a "pro-Semite", his remarks about George Soros and Jewish communities have drawn condemnation from the Anti-Defamation League and the White House under Joe Biden. An immigrant himself, Musk has blamed immigration policy for illegal immigration, been described as anti-immigration, and has promoted misleading narratives about voter fraud in the United States.

== Politics and elections ==
Musk has been described as being closely associated with techno-libertarians, ideologically a libertarian authoritarian, and has more recently been described as far-right in regards to European politics. Having criticized and feuded with Donald Trump, Musk supported Trump for the 2024 United States presidential election as the largest financial contributor to his campaign. Soon after, by appointment of Trump, Musk was given "special government employee" status as the de facto head of the Department of Government Efficiency (DOGE). Describing himself as "a free speech absolutist", Musk has regularly criticized American and European immigration policies, and his views on transgender issues, women, and race, have been controversial. Musk advocates for the U.S. to withdraw from both NATO and the United Nations.

=== United States ===
Avatar of Elon Musk

Elon Musk
(@elonmusk)
tweeted:

Thanks Jack. To be clear, I am not a conservative. Am registered independent & politically moderate. Doesn't mean I'm moderate about all issues. Humanitarian issues are extremely important to me & I don't understand why they are not important to everyone.

July 14, 2018

Before embracing Donald Trump in 2024 election cycle, Musk was known to have supported Barack Obama, Hillary Clinton, and even Joe Biden in 2020. In 2014, Musk described himself politically as "half Democrat, half Republican" and "somewhere in the middle, socially liberal and fiscally conservative". By 2018, he stated that he was "not a conservative" and saw himself as a "politically moderate"; he added, "Doesn't mean I'm moderate about all issues." He stated that he had "voted overwhelmingly for Democrats, historically" but in 2022 began supporting Republicans, with his views becoming more right-wing.

==== 2016–2020 ====
In 2016, prompted by the emergence of artificial intelligence, Musk has voiced support for a universal basic income; he additionally backs direct democracy and has stated he thinks the government on Mars will be a direct democracy. He supported targeting an inclusive tax rate of 40%; prefers consumption taxes to income taxes; and supports the estate tax, as the "probability of progeny being equally excellent at capital allocation is not high." In an interview with The Washington Post, Musk stated he was a significant donor to Democrats and also gives heavily to Republicans. Musk further stated that political contributions are a requirement in order to have a voice in the United States federal government.

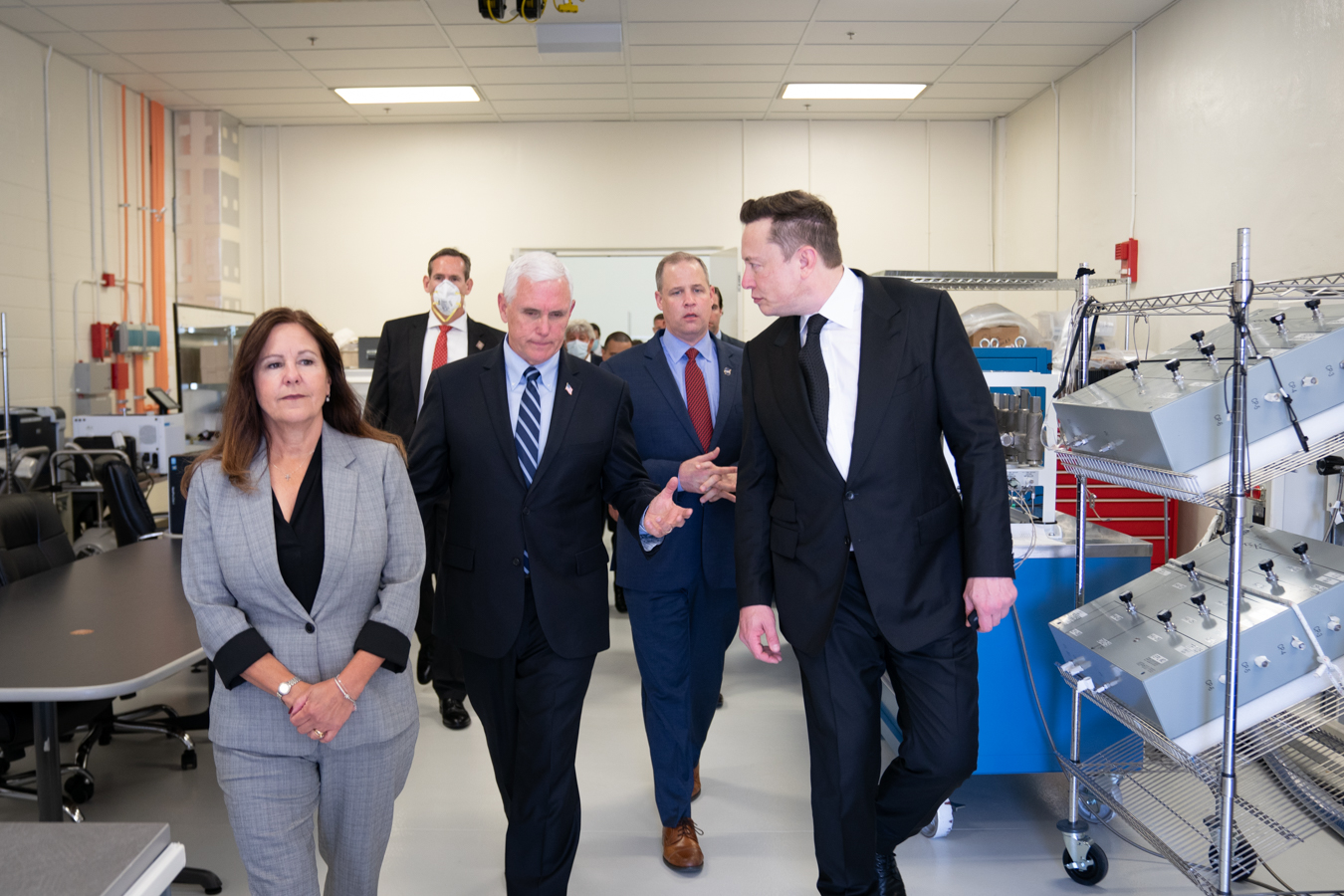
Musk with Vice President Mike Pence and Second Lady Karen Pence, May 2020

In 2019, Musk tweeted in support of the Democratic presidential candidate Andrew Yang, agreeing that universal basic income was required. The following year, Musk voiced support for Kanye West's independent run for president. Musk at the time described the United States as "[inarguably] the greatest country that has ever existed on Earth", describing it as "the greatest force for good of any country that's ever been." Musk believes democracy would not exist any longer if not for the United States, saying that it prevented this disappearance on three occasions through its participation in World War I, World War II, and the Cold War, while believing the country is not perfect and has made many mistakes.

Avatar of Elon Musk

Elon Musk
(@elonmusk)
tweeted:

In general, I believe government should rarely impose its will upon the people, and, when doing so, should aspire to maximize their cumulative happiness. That said, I would prefer to stay out of politics.

September 2, 2021

==== 2021–present ====
In 2021, in response to Texas governor Greg Abbott saying that Musk supported Texas' "social policies", Musk said he believed government "should rarely impose its will upon the people". The following year, Musk said that he could "no longer support" the Democrats, saying that "they have become the party of division & hate" and would be voting Republican due to Biden's support for unions and his inability to "get a lot done".

In June 2022, Musk voted for Mayra Flores in a special election, stating it was the first time he ever voted Republican, while also considering Ron DeSantis in the 2024 U.S. presidential election. In November, Musk clarified he would support DeSantis if he chose to run.

In January 2024, Musk participated in a forum with Bill Ackman and Democratic presidential primary challenger, Representative Dean Phillips regarding his presidential bid. During the forum, after hearing about the various challenges the Democratic Party presented to Phillips's campaign, Musk denounced the process of removing candidates from ballots as being "fundamentally anti-democratic". In July 2024, Musk called Kamala Harris an "extinctionist" due to comments about young people being anxious about having kids due to climate change.

==== Donald Trump ====
Avatar of Elon Musk

Elon Musk
(@elonmusk)
tweeted:

I love @realDonaldTrump as much as a straight man can love another man

February 7, 2025

Musk criticized Donald Trump prior to his first presidency in 2016 and the two feuded in 2022, as well as subsequent years. In 2024 there flourished what was described by The Independent as a "rapid and intense bromance between two of the world's most powerful men." In February 2025, Musk publicly stated he loved Trump as "a straight man", before feuding again with President Trump in June.

===== 2016–2020 =====
Before the election of Donald Trump as president of the United States in November 2016, Musk criticized Trump by saying he was "not the right guy" and did not have the "character that reflects well on the United States". Following Trump's inauguration in January 2017, Musk accepted an invitation to participate in two councils advising the president, and also criticized Trump's travel ban, regarding "citizens from certain primarily Muslim countries". In June, a few months later, he resigned from both business advisory councils in protest of Trump's decision to withdraw the United States from the Paris Agreement on climate change, stating: "Climate change is real. Leaving Paris is not good for America or the world".

In May 2020, amidst Musk's restarting of Tesla assembly plant production during the COVID-19 pandemic, Trump tweeted in support of Musk, which Musk publicly thanked him for. According to Walter Isaacson's biography of Musk, he reportedly did not vote in the 2020 presidential election since he believed that it was a waste of time to vote due to California being an uncontested state.

===== 2022 feud =====
Avatar of Elon Musk

Elon Musk
(@elonmusk)
tweeted:

Trump would be 82 at end of term, which is too old to be chief executive of anything, let alone the United States of America. If DeSantis runs against Biden in 2024, then DeSantis will easily win – he doesn't even need to campaign.

July 12, 2022

When Elon Musk came to the White House asking me for help on all of his many subsidized projects, whether it's electric cars that don't drive long enough, driverless cars that crash, or rocketships to nowhere, without which subsidies he'd be worthless, and telling me how he was a big Trump fan and Republican, I could have said, 'drop to your knees and beg,' and he would have done it.

— Donald Trump, July 13, 2022

In July 2022, Trump referred to Musk as a "bullshit artist" and called Musk's contract with Twitter "rotten". Musk responded by describing Trump as being too old for the presidency, instead favoring Ron DeSantis for the 2024 presidential election. Afterwards, Trump stated on Truth Social that Musk had come to the White House requesting help with subsidized projects and that had he been asked to beg, "he would have done it"; Trump also said on Truth Social that "Now Elon should focus on getting himself out of the Twitter mess because he could owe $44 billion for something that's perhaps worthless. Also, lots of competition for electric cars!".

In 2022, after Trump's Twitter suspension was reversed, Musk told Isaacson about Trump that "he's disruptive. He's the world's champion of bullshit." In 2024, New York Magazine described the feud over the past few years as "on-again, off-again".

==== 2024 presidential election ====
In July 2024, Musk endorsed Donald Trump shortly after the attempted assassination in Pennsylvania, and it was reported that he pledged the commitment to a pro-Trump super PAC on a monthly basis, making Musk the single largest individual donor to Trump's campaign.

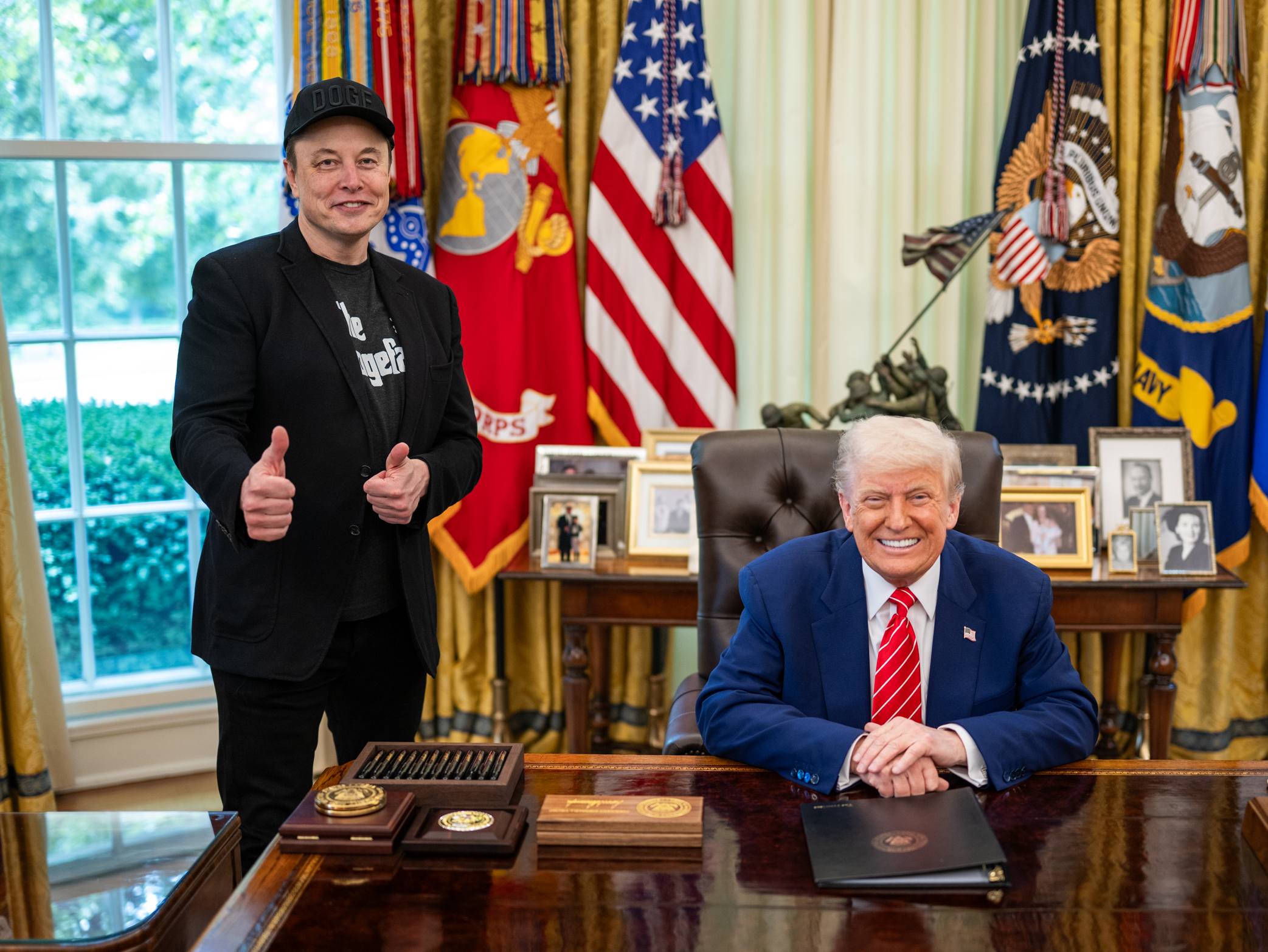
Musk with president Donald Trump in May 2025

In September 2024, following another attempted assassination of Trump, Musk received backlash after posting the now-deleted tweet: "And no one is even trying to assassinate Biden/Kamala". The following month, at a rally in Butler, Pennsylvania, Musk declared the presidential election crucial for preserving democracy, stating that Donald Trump was the only candidate capable of achieving this. Wearing a black "Make America Great Again" cap, he warned that if Trump lost, it might be the last election, marking his first appearance at a Trump event. Musk positioned Trump as a champion of free speech, and accused Democrats of threatening various rights, including the right to vote.

In December 2024, The Washington Post reported that Musk had donated $277 million to Trump and allied Republicans, making him the single largest individual political donor in the 2024 election and the largest donor since at least 2010, not counting candidates who funded their own campaigns, according to data from OpenSecrets. The Post described Musk as being referred to by some Republicans as "the Soros of the right".

===== 2025 feud =====
Avatar of Elon Musk

Elon Musk
(@elonmusk)
tweeted:

Time to drop the really big bomb:

@realDonaldTrump is in the Epstein files. That is the real reason they have not been made public.

Have a nice day, DJT!

June 5, 2025

A feud between Musk and Trump occurred in June 2025 following Musk's exit from the second Trump administration with his criticisms of the One Big Beautiful Bill Act. Musk described the bill as a "disgusting abomination" and alleged Trump had ties to sex offender Jeffrey Epstein.

==== Public office ====
The concept of the Department of Government Efficiency (DOGE), a department for streamlining government efficiency, emerged in a discussion between Musk and Trump, and in August 2024, Trump committed to giving Musk an advisory role, with Musk accepting the offer. Musk was described as having more of a "technology approach", according to Vivek Ramaswamy, who was originally intended co-chair the department alongside Musk. In November 2024, he suggested that the organization could help to cut the U.S. federal budget, consolidate the number of federal agencies, and eliminate the Consumer Financial Protection Bureau. The following month, he described the final stage of DOGE as "deleting itself". While his official role is not clear, he was given "special government employee" status, with the organization created by executive order in January 2025. Soon after, Musk was criticised for his treatment towards employees, prioritized secrecy within the organization, and accused others of violating privacy laws, stating "Don't mess with DOGE" on X.

=== Germany ===
==== Alternative für Deutschland campaign rally appearance ====
External videos
- Frontline PBS coverage of Elon Musk's appearance at the AfD rally

During a campaign rally of Alternative für Deutschland in January 2025, Musk also joined for a short speech through a video call. Therein, he reiterated his previous statements of party support from X and his op-ed in Die Welt, as well as calling into question the European Union's regulatory reach. In addition, Musk criticized Germany's culture of remembrance, stating that there is "too much of a focus on past guilt and we need to move beyond that". Following Musk's speech, Weidel thanked him for his statements, praised the second presidency of Donald Trump that Musk is closely associated with, and ended her statement with "Make Germany Great Again". AfD politician Maximilian Krah remarked of the appearance "we have the richest and most innovative entrepreneur in the world on our side. We have Elon Musk so of course that makes us extremely sexy. And perception is reality. [...] It shows that we are a serious political force."

Musk's statements on remembrance culture have been widely criticized, in particular due to their timing shortly before the 80th anniversary of the liberation of the Auschwitz concentration camp. Olaf Scholz condemned Musk's comments as well as his general push of European far-right parties. Donald Tusk, prime minister of Poland, called Musk's words on remembrance culture "too familiar and ominous". Steffen Seibert, German ambassador to Israel at the time, stated that "Musk doesn't seem to know [Germany] well at all" and that people are not made felt guilty for crimes committed by the Nazis, contrary to his claims.

=== Free speech ===
Avatar of Elon Musk

Elon Musk
(@elonmusk)
tweeted:

Starlink has been told by some governments (not Ukraine) to block Russian news sources. We will not do so unless at gunpoint. Sorry to be a free speech absolutist.

March 5, 2022

Musk calls himself "a free speech absolutist", identifying his definition of free speech as "that which matches the law", while advocating that corporate censorship of speech should not go significantly beyond minimum legal requirements. He has attempted to silence some critics' speech, including journalists and non-profit organisations, and engaged in censorship on behalf of Twitter.

I believe in its potential to be the platform for free speech around the globe, and I believe free speech is a societal imperative for a functioning democracy.

However, since making my investment I now realize the company will neither thrive nor serve this societal imperative in its current form. Twitter needs to be transformed as a private company.

— Elon Musk, filing with the U.S. Securities and Exchange Commission, April 2022

In April 2022, Musk made an offer to buy Twitter, believing that "free speech is a societal imperative for a functioning democracy". Since Musk's acquisition of Twitter, the platform has increased its approval of censorship requests by governments. During the 2023 Turkish presidential election, Twitter limited access to content in Turkey, including critics of incumbent president Recep Tayyip Erdoğan, political opponents, and journalists. Musk defended this move by stating that the alternative would have been to "throttle [Twitter] in its entirety", and said it was normal for Internet companies to do. Twitter has also censored tweets and blocked accounts that are critical of India's prime minister Narendra Modi and his Bharatiya Janata Party, with Musk stating that Twitter is left with no choice but to "obey local government", as a believer in upholding lawful censorship requests. Twitter has filed strategic lawsuits against public participation for some U.S. critics, and it is facing a speech-related case involving a critic in Germany. Musk has also called for several of his critics to be criminally prosecuted.

Avatar of Elon Musk

Elon Musk
(@elonmusk)
tweeted:

Truth Social (terrible name) exists because Twitter censored free speech

April 22, 2022

According to Musk, the alt-tech platform Truth Social (Note: Trump created the alt-tech platform in 2022 after Twitter banned him for inciting violence following the 2021 United States Capitol attack.) exists because of censorship on Twitter. In May 2022, Musk called Twitter's decision to ban Trump "morally wrong", announcing he would reverse Trump's ban when after purchasing Twitter.

In November 2022, Musk tweeted that he was so committed to free speech that he would not ban @ElonJet, a Twitter account that tracked the publicly available real-time flight data of Musk's private plane. Musk reversed his position the following month, banning the account and several journalists who had reported on it, accused them of doxxing, and threatening legal action. He has also refused to block Russian state media on SpaceX's Starlink satellites in response to Russia's invasion of Ukraine.

In February 2025, Tesla fired a manager who had been openly critical of Musk, a move seen at odds with Musk's purported free speech views. In March 2025, Musk pressured Reddit CEO Steve Huffman to prevent subreddits from banning links to Twitter and ban subreddits critical of the Trump administration, leading to the r/WhitePeopleofTwitter subreddit being banned for 72 hours. In an interview, Musk said he would be working with the Trump administration to "go after" people "pushing the lies" about Tesla.

=== Gun rights ===
In the aftermath of the Uvalde school shooting in 2022, Musk supported strict background checks on all gun purchases and limiting the sale of assault rifles to those living in "high risk" locations with issues such as "gang warfare" and to owners of gun ranges. Believing in a special permit and vigorous vetting, Musk has said that he firmly believes "that the right to bear arms is an important safeguard against potential tyranny of government. Historically, maintaining their power over the people is why those in power did not allow public ownership of guns".

=== Ideology ===
Having previously been described as a "Silicon Valley libertarian", in late 2022, The Atlantic wrote that Musk was "a right-wing activist" who was aiding the far-right, and "appears deeply committed to the right's culture war against progressivism in most forms", while Musk affirmed he was a centrist. The magazine described his activism as being "personally motivated", as opposed to ideologically motivated. A year later, the New Statesman described his libertarianism as being "infused with authoritarian tendencies". In July 2024, Bloomberg declared Musk was "going all in on right-wing politics" and embracing the conservative movement. In October, a CNN reporter described Musk as finding Trump's authoritarian leanings appealing, and a month later, The Spectator credited Musk with bringing "the techno-libertarian elite, a small but very wealthy group, into Trump's largely blue-collar, industrial and conservative base", thus increasing the support base.

In early 2025, The Conversation analysed Musk's path towards far-right politics within the context of "the libertarian to alt-right pipeline" (Note: According to The Conversation, "The alt-right or "alternative right" refers to the recent resurgence of far-right political movements opposing multiculturalism, gender equality and diversity, and supporting white nationalism".) and the shift of the Libertarian Party to the right. The magazine stated that "he remains a limited-government libertarian", and that his online personality is "part of a deliberate alt-right populist strategy to stoke controversy", intended to disturb the left and claim persecution when criticized. Wired opined that Musk had become "the hero of America's far-right movement", and had become paramount within far-right community discussions. Jacobin defined his politics as libertarian authoritarianism, (Note: According to Jacobin, "Libertarian authoritarians want to abolish the democratic state, which they see as a machine that restricts individual freedoms" and "consider the democratic state itself, the authorities and their regulations, to be invasive and harmful.") based on his political activities combining "authoritarian nationalism with a distinctive postmodern, libertarian streak". The magazine attributed his transition into a "chief amplifier of global authoritarianism", based on his past criticisms of Black Lives Matter, diversity, equity and inclusion, and "wokeness", describing Musk as "the first truly global oligarch".

Al Jazeera reported that although Musk was supported by some for his salute, his public persona remains libertarian; described as passionately protesting against regulation, government waste, and "freeing the potential of the market and of individuals". Political scientist Jean-Yves Camus argued that Musk is not a Nazi, and alongside Trump, is "self-serving rather than ideological" who instead favours an autocracy, and The Guardian hypothesised that his "closeness with rightwing populist parties" may be of benefit to his businesses. The Nation warned that Musk has raised "the specter of massive corruption and authoritarianism to an immediate threat", after U.S. Senator Bernie Sanders described Trump and Musk's attempts to restructure the federal government as "the growth of oligarchy", and part of the shift towards authoritarianism.

=== Immigration ===
Musk has regularly criticized American and European immigration policies. An immigrant himself, he is described as being "anti-immigration" and has distributed false information regarding immigration and voter fraud, promoted misleading narratives, and engaged in misinformation.

Since the inauguration of the Biden administration in 2021, Musk has expressed various disapprovals of its immigration policies, regularly criticizing illegal immigration and the crimes allegedly committed by them, and has promoted the theory that an increase in illegal immigration is the alleged goal of "importing voters". Musk clarified his opinion that votes are coming from counting unauthorized immigrants during the census, which shifts the proportion of seats in the House of Representatives toward states with large number of undocumented immigrants, with such states predominantly voting for Democrats. Analysis from Bloomberg described his posts on the topic as those that "primarily promote misleading narratives", and helps amplify Trump's policies on immigration. BBC Verify reported that Musk's engagement with misinformation on the subject was a "key theme" since endorsing Trump in July 2024, and The Washington Post likened the imported voters theory as being "adjacent rhetoric" to the "great replacement" conspiracy theory. That year, Musk reached over one thousands tweets and over 10 billion views on the topic of immigration and voter fraud, which became his most tweeted topic.

In September 2023, Musk livestreamed a visit to the Texas border with Mexico during an influx in migrant arrivals. Musk called for improving the immigration system to allow more "hard-working and honest" migrants, while also stopping illegal migrants who are breaking the law. That same month, Musk retweeted a video that showed a non-governmental organization working to assist migrants in the Mediterranean with the caption about Germany NGO ships "collecting illegal immigrants to be unloaded in Italy". Musk's retweet bore the caption "Is the German public aware of this?" to which the German Foreign Ministry responded "Yes. And it's called saving lives." Musk responded to the Foreign Ministry declaring that Germany had violated sovereignty with the remark "Has invasion vibes".

Avatar of Bernie Sanders

Bernie Sanders
(@SenSanders)
tweeted:

Elon Musk is wrong.

The main function of the H-1B visa program is not to hire "the best and the brightest", but rather to replace good-paying American jobs with low-wage indentured servants from abroad.

The cheaper the labor they hire, the more money the billionaires make.

January 2, 2025

Musk has defended the use of H-1B visas to attract highly skilled workers to the U.S., having once been on the same visa. In December 2024, during a period of online discussion on whether H-1B visas should be reformed, he said that Silicon Valley firms need foreign workers (via H-1B) because there are not enough "super motivated" and "super talented engineers" in America. This was controversial and drew criticism from opponents of immigration who believe that importing foreign workers would negatively impact American workers, and the debate was dubbed the "MAGA Civil War". U.S. Senator Bernie Sanders criticised Musk's stance, viewing it as the importation of cheap labour that benefits billionaires.

=== Judiciary ===
After multiple United States federal judges ruled against the Trump administration's actions, Musk in February 2025 proposed "an immediate wave of judicial impeachments". Musk in March 2025 declared: "It's like any federal judge can stop any action by the President of the United States. This is insane, and this has got to stop ... at the federal level and at the state level".

Following the killing of Iryna Zarutska in Charlotte, North Carolina in August 2025, Musk criticized judges and district attorneys for allowing "criminals to walk free."

When Russell Brand was sentenced to a decade in prison for rape, Musk said that the UK's lack of a statute of limitations for rape and sexual assault was "a crazy legal standard".

=== Labor rights ===
I disagree with the idea of unions. I just don't like anything which creates a lords and peasants sort of thing. I think the unions naturally try to create negativity in a company.

— Elon Musk, at the New York Times Dealbook Summit, December 2023

Musk has been critical of trade unions. In December 2023, Musk commented that he disagreed with "the idea of unions", describing a "lords and peasants" scenario. In 2018, Musk tweeted "Nothing stopping Tesla team at our car plant from voting union ... But why pay union dues & give up stock options for nothing?" while the United Auto Workers (UAW) union was campaigning at Tesla, in the Fremont Factory in California.

=== Race and white nationalism ===
In February 2023, following racist comments from cartoonist Scott Adams in which he described Black people as a hate group and encouraged racial segregation, Musk opined that the media was being racist against Whites and Asians. Musk has amplified false claims of white genocide in South Africa.

I'll say what I want, and if the consequence of that is losing money, so be it, [...]

— Elon Musk, speaking with David Faber from CNBC, May 2023

In May 2023, Musk attacked George Soros on Twitter after the investor sold a small stake in Tesla, comparing Soros to the Jewish supervillain Magneto. In his defence, Musk stated he believes Soros wanted to "erode the very fabric of civilization". Musk's comment was criticized as antisemitic by the Anti-Defamation League (ADL), noting that Soros had long been the target of conspiracy theories, and by a member of the Israeli Foreign Ministry. He was also defended by a minister of Israeli's Ministry of Diaspora Affairs, who deemed the post as not being antisemitic. Musk later denied being antisemitic and described himself as a "pro-Semite".

In August 2023, Musk criticized the "Kill the Boer" song which was sung by Julius Malema during a rally for the far-left South African political party Economic Freedom Fighters, asserting that the song advocated the genocide of white people, which was rejected by Malema. A month later, Musk assured Benjamin Netanyahu that he was against antisemitism. Musk discussed the issues online with a panel of right-leaning Jewish leaders including former Israeli president Reuven Rivlin, attorney Alan Dershowitz, who represented Donald Trump in his first impeachment trial, as well as several Rabbis including Shmuley Boteach, where Musk denied allegations of antisemitism and cited the suspension of Kanye West as an example of enforcement on his platform. The group also criticized the ADL's criticism of Musk.

If somebody is going to try to blackmail me with advertising, blackmail me with money, go fuck yourself. Go fuck yourself. Is that clear? I hope it is.

— Elon Musk, at the DealBook Summit, November 27, 2023

In November 2023, Musk posted a response in which he expressed his agreement with an antisemitic tweet in which Jews were described as promoting "hatred against whites", writing "You have said the actual truth." Following this, Musk said it was "super messed-up" that white people are not "allowed to be proud of their race." He was condemned by the White House for his post, described as a "hideous lie". Musk later acknowledged the tweet as a mistake, saying "I handed a loaded gun to those who hate me and to those who are antisemitic and for that I am quite sorry", and described his tweet as very foolish.

The day after he posted the tweet, Musk announced he would ban pro-Palestinian slogans such as "decolonization" and "from the river to the sea" on Twitter, for which he received praise from ADL CEO Jonathan Greenblatt. Columnist Michelle Goldberg wrote in The New York Times that "Musk appears to have learned the lesson that ardent Zionism can function as an alibi for antisemitism." The Guardian writer and senior editor Sam Wolfson wrote, "Over and over again, alleged antisemites or those who give platforms to antisemites have had their offenses chalked off by some in the pro-Israel movement, as long as they show sufficient deference to the Israeli project."

Musk stated that he does not believe that "all Jewish communities" promote dialectical hatred towards white people and that he was "deeply offended" by the ADL, while denouncing what he described as "anti-white racism or anti-Asian racism or racism". He also tweeted that his criticism of Jews applies to more groups than just the ADL. At the DealBook Summit, when journalist Andrew Ross Sorkin questioned Musk about the withdrawal of advertisers from X following his recent posts, Musk responded by accusing the advertisers of blackmail and stated, "Go fuck yourself".

In August 2024, Musk ignited a controversy after he shared an allegedly Islamophobic meme. He subsequently feuded with First Minister of Scotland Humza Yousaf, who described him as "one of the most dangerous men on the planet" and a "race baiter" who should be held to account. Musk responded that Yousaf is a racist "scumbag" who "loathes white people".

In January 2025, at a campaign event which was staged by the German far-right political party Alternative for Germany, Elon stated that "There is too much focus on past guilt, and we need to move beyond that". That same week, Musk was criticized for a controversial gesture that was interpreted by some as a Nazi salute, which he made during Trump's inauguration, his comments about past guilt were condemned by the chairman of Israel's official memorial to Holocaust victims.

In January 2026, Musk reshared a tweet about "white solidarity" and on the same day, he claimed states like California are using immigrants to create a "one-party state".

=== LGBTQ rights ===
In 2018, Musk shared a post by Tesla, about the company's ranking on the Corporate Equality Index; Tesla stated, "Thanks to everyone at Tesla for making LGBTQ inclusion an important part of our culture." Musk commented, in reply to another user, "Don't buy our car if that's a problem. People should be free to live their lives where their heart takes them". In 2022, Musk reaffirmed those comments, and also posted, "Tesla scores 100/100 for 7th year in a row for LGBTQ equality" on the Corporate Equality Index.

Following Musk's takeover of Twitter in October 2022, the platform has seen an increase in hate speech toward the LGBTQ community, for which he has received criticism.

Musk said of gay people in March 2024, "My observation is that people are born one way or another – it is not a choice. People should find mutual love and happiness where their heart leads them. I only ask of my gay friends that they have children for the continuance of civilization."

In July 2024, Musk said that a California law which bans teachers from being required to report a change in a child's gender identity or sexual orientation was the "final straw" in deciding to move the headquarters of SpaceX and Twitter from California to Texas.

==== On transgender topics ====
Musk's views on transgender issues have provoked controversy, leading to being characterized as transphobic.

Avatar of Elon Musk

Elon Musk
(@elonmusk)
tweeted:

I absolutely support trans, but all these pronouns are an esthetic nightmare

December 16, 2020

In July 2020, Musk made headlines when he tweeted "Pronouns suck." The tweet was interpreted by The Independent as a slight to preferred gender pronouns, and was criticized by many, including LGBTQ advocacy group Human Rights Campaign and Musk's then partner Grimes. In a later tweet, Musk stated he supported "trans", but that pronouns are "an esthetic nightmare". In December 2022, Musk again mocked preferred gender pronouns in a tweet that read "My Pronouns are Prosecute/Fauci." In a 2023 interview, Grimes said she discussed transgender topics with Musk at length. She recounted that Musk's views appeared to her to stem from "hate [of] woke culture" and his "concerns about the fertility thing"; Grimes said to him that "fertility tech … could be innovated that would help trans people". Musk stated in 2024 that he personally does use people's preferred gender pronouns, from a "standpoint of good manners".

In 2020, Musk's daughter, Vivian Wilson, underwent a gender transition. Wilson changed her name, and no longer wished to be associated with her father. Walter Isaacson, who wrote a 2023 authorized biography of Musk, stated that Musk was "generally sanguine" when he initially discovered Wilson was transgender, "but then Jenna (Note: Isaacson, including in his book, sometimes refers to Vivian Jenna Wilson by her middle name, Jenna.) became a fervent Marxist and broke off all relations". However, Isaacson's book states that due to disagreements about capitalism, Musk and Wilson were already "estranged" before Musk knew she was transgender. Isaacson wrote that Musk became politically more right-leaning in 2021, "partly triggered by his daughter Jenna's transition, her embrace of radical socialist politics, and her decision to break off relations with him." (Wilson said this was inaccurate for multiple reasons, e.g. that she opposes wealth inequality but is not Marxist.) According to Isaacson's book, Musk said that "she went beyond socialism to being a full communist and thinking that anyone rich is evil. … I've made many overtures but she doesn't want to spend time with me."

Avatar of Elon Musk

Elon Musk
(@elonmusk)
tweeted:

Repeated, targeted harassment against any account will cause the harassing accounts to receive, at minimum, temporary suspensions.
The words "cis" or "cisgender" are considered slurs on this platform.

June 21, 2023

In April 2023, Twitter quietly removed a policy prohibiting targeted deadnaming and misgendering of transgender users. This policy was reintroduced in 2024, however, Musk said it would be sparingly enforced, to reduce visibility of posts considered to be "repeated, targeted harassment of a particular person." In June 2023, Musk deemed the word cisgender a slur, stating that it violated Twitter's conduct policy. That same month, What Is a Woman?, a controversial documentary about transgender issues that was initially flagged by Twitter as hate speech, went viral after Musk personally promoted it and pinned it to his profile. Musk has also expressed opposition to gender-affirming care for minors and has stated he will be "actively lobbying to criminalize" such care. In July 2024, Musk said his daughter's gender dysphoria was related to being "born gay and slightly autistic"; he said he gave parental consent for her transition at the age of 16, but that he was "essentially tricked" into doing so. (Wilson disputes this, saying Musk was "not by any means tricked" but rather gave informed consent; she has also come out as bisexual rather than gay.)

Avatar of Elon Musk

Elon Musk
(@elonmusk)
tweeted:

Cis is a heterophobic word. Shame on anyone who uses it.

January 11, 2024

In January 2024, Musk declared that cisgender is a "heterophobic" word. PinkNews argued that it does not refer to heterosexual people.

== Science and technology ==
Avatar of Elon Musk

Elon Musk
(@elonmusk)
tweeted:

Since legacy media propaganda is considered a "valid" source by Wikipedia, it naturally simply becomes an extension of legacy media propaganda!

January 21, 2025

Musk considers artificial intelligence to be one of the most significant threats to the human race, has received considerable criticism for his comments and actions related to the COVID-19 pandemic, supports the colonization of Mars, favors individualized transport over public transport, and has opposed banning TikTok. Musk has also been highly critical of Wikipedia; describing the encyclopedia as "woke", controlled by the mainstream media and far-left activists, and has called for its defunding.

=== Artificial intelligence ===
Musk has frequently spoken about the potential dangers of artificial intelligence (AI), declaring it as "the most serious threat to the survival of the human race". During a 2014 interview at the MIT AeroAstro Centennial Symposium, Musk described AI as humanity's largest existential threat, stating his belief in the need for regulatory oversight.

Musk invested in DeepMind, an AI firm, and Vicarious, a company working to improve machine intelligence, and was formerly co-chairman of OpenAI as a co-founder. Musk later criticized OpenAI for becoming closed-sourced and for-profit, and interpreted its chatbot ChatGPT of political bias. In March 2023, he signed an open letter calling for a pause on large-scale AI experiments, citing profound risks for society. The president of the Information Technology and Innovation Foundation (ITIF), Robert D. Atkinson, argued that Musk and others stating that AI is the "largest existential threat to humanity" is "not a very winning message if you want to get AI funding out of Congress to the National Science Foundation."

I like to just keep an eye on what's going on with artificial intelligence. I think there is potentially a dangerous outcome there. There have been movies about this, you know, like Terminator, [...]

— Elon Musk, speaking to CNBC, June 2014

In 2014, Musk expressed his concerns referencing Terminator, stating "we should try to make sure the outcomes are good, not bad". In 2015, as an advisor to the nonprofit Future of Life Institute, an organization focused on advanced technologies, Musk donated $10 million. The following year, when asked whether he thinks humans live in a computer simulation, perhaps controlled by a vast AI, Musk stated that "the odds that we're in 'base reality' is one in billions." Harvard physicist Lisa Randall disputed this arguing there was "no real evidence" of a simulation.

At the 2019 World AI Conference, Musk contended that "computers are already smarter than human beings" and that this alone was reason for caution regarding AI. Musk warned of unintended consequences of AI and stated that immediate steps should be taken to prevent disaster.

Musk's opinions about AI have provoked controversy and have been criticized by experts such as Yann LeCun, who contended that Musk's panic was influenced by reading Nick Bostrom's book Superintelligence, and by Musk's attraction to the idea that he will save humanity. Facebook's head of AI said that Musk was ill-informed about AI and noted that his comments about a future machine takeover distracts people from real, immediate AI concerns, such as algorithms exacerbating inequality. Consequently, according to CNBC, Musk is "not always looked upon favorably" by the AI research community. Mark Zuckerberg has clashed with Musk on the issue and called his AI warnings "pretty irresponsible".

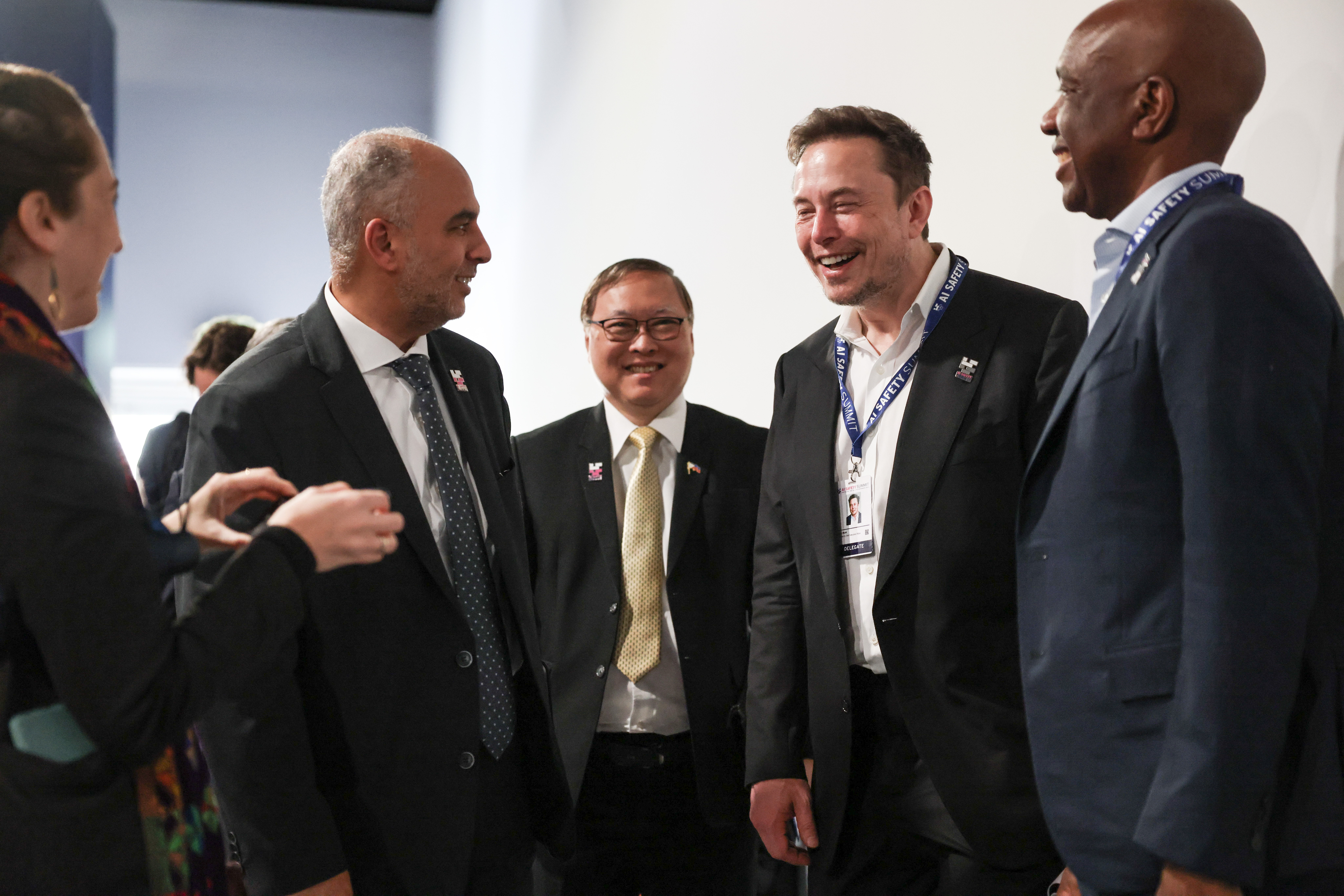
Musk at the AI Safety Summit in the London, November 2024

In November 2024, while speaking at the AI Safety Summit in London, attended by world leaders and tech figures, Musk applauded the Prime Minister Rishi Sunak for hosting the event. In doing so, he reiterated his concerns that the intelligence is "potentially the most pressing [existential risks] that we face", while anticipating that it would become "far more intelligent" than human beings.

=== COVID-19 pandemic ===
Avatar of Elon Musk

Elon Musk
(@elonmusk)
tweeted:

Based on current trends, probably close to zero new cases in US too by end of April

March 19, 2020

Musk has received criticism over his views and actions related to the COVID-19 pandemic. In early 2020, Musk referred to COVID-19 as a "specific form of the common cold", stated that "the coronavirus panic is dumb", and that the "danger of panic still far exceeds danger of corona imo [in my opinion]. If we over-allocate medical resources to corona, it will come at expense of treating other illnesses". Musk has additionally been criticized for tweeting contentious comments on the disease, including that "Kids are essentially immune, but elderly with existing conditions are vulnerable", and for speculating that the pandemic would soon be ending according to "current trends". In addition, he promoted articles which suggested that healthcare companies were inflating COVID-19 case numbers for financial reasons.

When the Alameda County Sheriff ordered all non-essential businesses to shut down, Musk and Tesla initially refused to comply, arguing that vehicle manufacturing and energy infrastructure are critical sectors, citing the U.S. Department of Homeland Security. Musk called the lockdown "fascist" on a Tesla earnings call, comparing the restrictions to forced imprisonment, and later sent out numerous tweets opposing mandatory lockdowns such as "FREE AMERICA NOW."

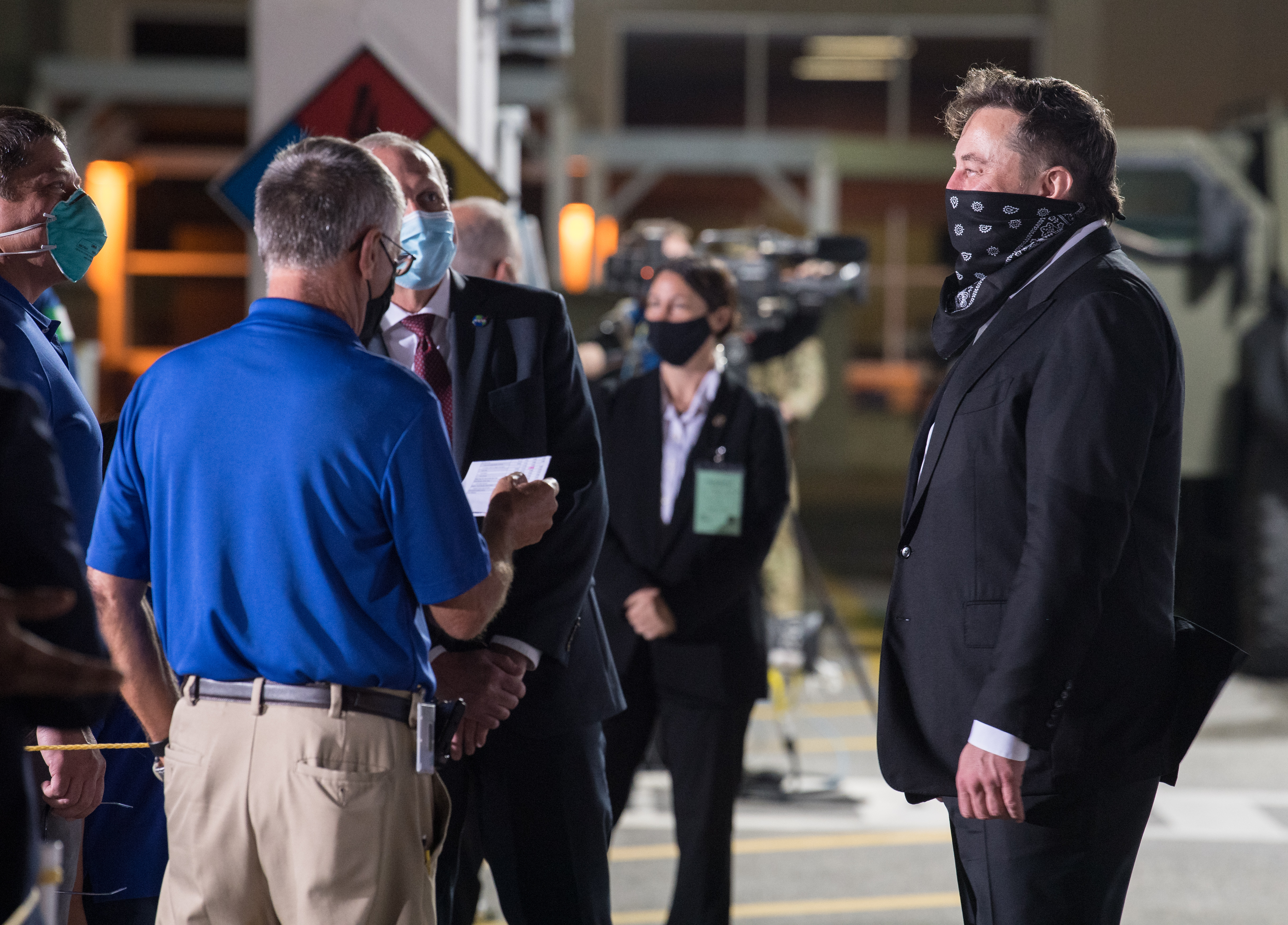
Musk wearing a bandana as a face mask during the COVID-19 pandemic

In March 2020, in response to a request to repurpose the Tesla factory to make urgently needed ventilators, Musk promised that Tesla would make ventilators "if there is a shortage". When Nate Silver responded that there was a current shortage, Musk replied, "Ventilators are not difficult, but cannot be produced instantly." After figures such as New York City mayor Bill de Blasio highlighted their hospitals' ventilator shortage and responded to Musk's offer, Musk said he thought the ventilators which Tesla was working on would probably be unneeded. A week later, Musk received widespread requests from dignitaries around the world, including the Ukrainian Health minister, Bolivia's Ambassador for Science and Technology to Silicon Valley, and Nigeria's Ministry of Finance. When asked about what they received from Musk, California hospital representatives noted that they received CPAP machines made by ResMed instead and not "full ventilators", though expressed gratitude.

Avatar of Elon Musk

Elon Musk
(@elonmusk)
tweeted:

Tesla is restarting production today against Alameda County rules. I will be on the line with everyone else. If anyone is arrested, I ask that it only be me.

May 11, 2020

In May 2020, Musk reopened Tesla's Fremont production line in defiance of and in violation of Alameda County's orders, and tweeted that "If anyone is arrested, I ask that it only be me." Musk also announced that Tesla would be moving its headquarters to Texas or Nevada and that Tesla had filed a lawsuit against Alameda County challenging its "shutdown" of the Fremont factory; the suit was subsequently withdrawn. The Alameda County Public Health Department explained it was waiting on a plan that Tesla had promised to provide by May 11 that would walk through how it would protect workers' health during the COVID-19 pandemic. An opening date of Monday, May 18 had been penciled in for Tesla, pending approval — the same date that Fiat Chrysler, Ford Motor Company, and General Motors were also due to restart production.

Avatar of Elon Musk

Elon Musk
(@elonmusk)
tweeted:

Am getting wildly different results from different labs, but most likely I have a moderate case of covid. My symptoms are that of a minor cold, which is no surprise, since a coronavirus is a type of cold.

November 14, 2020

In November 2020, the phrase "Space Karen" began to trend on Twitter after a scientist referred to Musk as such, over comments Musk made questioning the effectiveness of COVID-19 testing. Musk was also said to have spread misinformation about the virus by virologist Angela Rasmussen. with Musk referring to the virus as "a type of cold". The following month, Politico named Musk's prediction that there would be "close to zero new cases" as one of "the most audacious, confident and spectacularly incorrect prognostications about the year". Two years later, Musk tweeted "My pronouns are Prosecute/Fauci", drawing attention from US lawmakers. In February 2023, he praised anti-vaccine comments made by Woody Harrelson during Saturday Night Live.

=== International Space Station ===
In February 2025, Musk claimed during an interview with Fox News' Sean Hannity that International Space Station (ISS) crew Suni Williams and Butch Wilmore "were left up there for political reasons, which is not good." This claim was challenged by former ISS commander Andreas Mogensen which caused Musk to attack Mogensen calling him an "idiot" and "fully retarded". Mogensen responded to the attack saying "Elon, I have long admired you and what you have accomplished, especially at SpaceX and Tesla. You know as well as I do, that Butch and Suni are returning with Crew-9, as has been the plan since last September. Even now, you are not sending up a rescue ship to bring them home. They are returning on the Dragon capsule that has been on ISS since last September." Mogensen received the support of fellow astronauts brothers Mark Kelly and Scott Kelly, Musk responded saying that Mogensen had attacked him "despite having no idea what ACTUALLY happened." and by posting on X at Scott Kelly "Btw, your brother claims to be independent, but is just a Dem donor shill." Musk's inaccurate claim that Williams and Wilmore had been abandoned by the Biden administration was repeated by President Trump.

Following the digital dispute, Musk argued that the ISS should be deorbited early and that the funds should be redirected to Mars exploration. Musk clarified that his view was that "The decision is up to the President, but my recommendation is as soon as possible. I recommend 2 years from now,"

=== Mars ===
Avatar of Elon Musk

Elon Musk
(@elonmusk)
tweeted:

And that's just for Earth! Mars has zero human population. We need a lot of people to become a multiplanet civilization.

July 27, 2021

Musk has long been an advocate for space colonization, especially the colonization of Mars. As early as 2001, Elon became involved with the nonprofit Mars Society and has repeatedly pushed for humanity colonizing Mars, in order to become an interplanetary species and lower the risks of human extinction. In 2002 he left the society and began focusing on his own initiatives, and later envisioned establishing a direct democracy on Mars, with a system in which more votes would be required to create laws than remove them. Concerned with human population decline, Musk has described becoming "a multiplanet civilization". Musk has also cited the expansion of the sun as a reason for colonizing Mars.

=== Military technology ===
Musk has been highly critical of the F-35 program. He has also been critical of crewed aircraft in general declaring that "The fighter jet era has passed." at the Air & Space Forces Association's 2020 Air Warfare Symposium and writing "manned fighter jets are obsolete in the age of drones anyway. Will just get pilots killed." in 2024.

=== Public transport ===
At a Tesla event on the sidelines of the Conference on Neural Information Processing Systems in December 2017, Musk expressed his disappointment with public transport, citing the timing and locations for reasons why "everyone doesn't like it", suggesting this was why people prefer "individualized transport" instead.

Afterwards, he dismissed an audience member's response that public transportation functioned effectively in Japan. His comments sparked widespread criticism from both members of the public and transit experts. Urban planning expert Brent Toderian started the hashtag #GreatThingsThatHappenedonTransit, which was widely adopted by Twitter users to dispel Musk's notion that everyone hated public transport. Yonah Freemark, an urbanist and journalist specializing in planning and transportation, summarized Musk's views on public transport as being terrible.

Jarrett Walker, a public transport expert, said that "Musk's hatred of sharing space with strangers is a luxury (or pathology) that only the rich can afford", referring to the theory that planning a city around the preferences of a minority yields an outcome that usually does not work for the majority. Musk responded with "You're an idiot", then specified "sanctimonious idiot". The exchange received a significant amount of media attention and prompted Nobel laureate Paul Krugman to criticise the controversy.

=== Social media ===
In April 2023, Musk said he opposed banning TikTok in the United States, arguing that a ban would increase Twitter's active user base. In 2024, Musk opposed Australian plans to fine social media sites which enabled misinformation on their platforms, and to limit social media access for those under 16, with Musk commenting that it "Seems like a backdoor way to control access to the Internet by all Australians."

=== Wikipedia ===
In 2019, Musk described his Wikipedia article as "insane" and described it as a "war zone". In 2020, he encouraged his Twitter followers to "trash" the page, which led to the article being protected. In 2021, he wrote that he was glad Wikipedia existed. In April 2022, Musk tweeted: "They say history is written by the victors, but not on Wikipedia if the losing party is still alive & has lots of time on their hands!", in a reference to the article of Tesla Inc. co-founder Martin Eberhard.

Avatar of Elon Musk

Elon Musk
(@elonmusk)
tweeted:

A two day suspension of maybe 7 accounts for doxxing got an actual Wikipedia page!? Wikipedia is controlled by the MSM journalists. Can't trust that site anymore.

December 17, 2022

Musk responded to the December 2022 Twitter suspensions Wikipedia entry by proclaiming the site was "controlled by the MSM [mainstream media]", and that this makes it untrustworthy. In response, the Wikimedia Foundation changed a message appealing for donations to "Wikipedia is not for sale", stating "there is no danger that someone will buy Wikipedia and turn it into their personal playground".

Avatar of Elon Musk

Elon Musk
(@elonmusk)
tweeted:

Wokipedia has a possibly terminal case of the woke mind virus. Reddit too.

October 26, 2024

In October 2023, Musk criticized Wikipedia as "inherently hierarchical" and being "subject to the biases of higher ranking editors." In response to the Wikipedia funding appeal, Musk offered $1 billion in funding if Wikipedia changed its name to "Dickipedia". In October 2024, Musk stated the website was "controlled by far-left activists", discouraged donations, and characterized the online encyclopedia using the phrase "woke mind virus".

In January 2025, Musk called for Wikipedia to be "defunded" and referred to it as "legacy media propaganda", in response to his Wikipedia article being edited to describe the alleged "Nazi salute" he gave during a speech after the second inauguration of Donald Trump. Wikipedia co-founder Jimmy Wales responded by saying: "If Elon wanted to help, he'd be encouraging kind and thoughtful intellectual people he agrees with to engage."

In March 2025, Margaret Talbot wrote an article in The New Yorker dealing with the topic: "Elon Musk Also Has a Problem with Wikipedia". Talbot connected Musk's documented promotion of misinformation and his attacks against "mainstream media" with his admiration for "radical-right populism", citing how a study connected such conservative views with the "propensity to spread misinformation".

== International relations ==
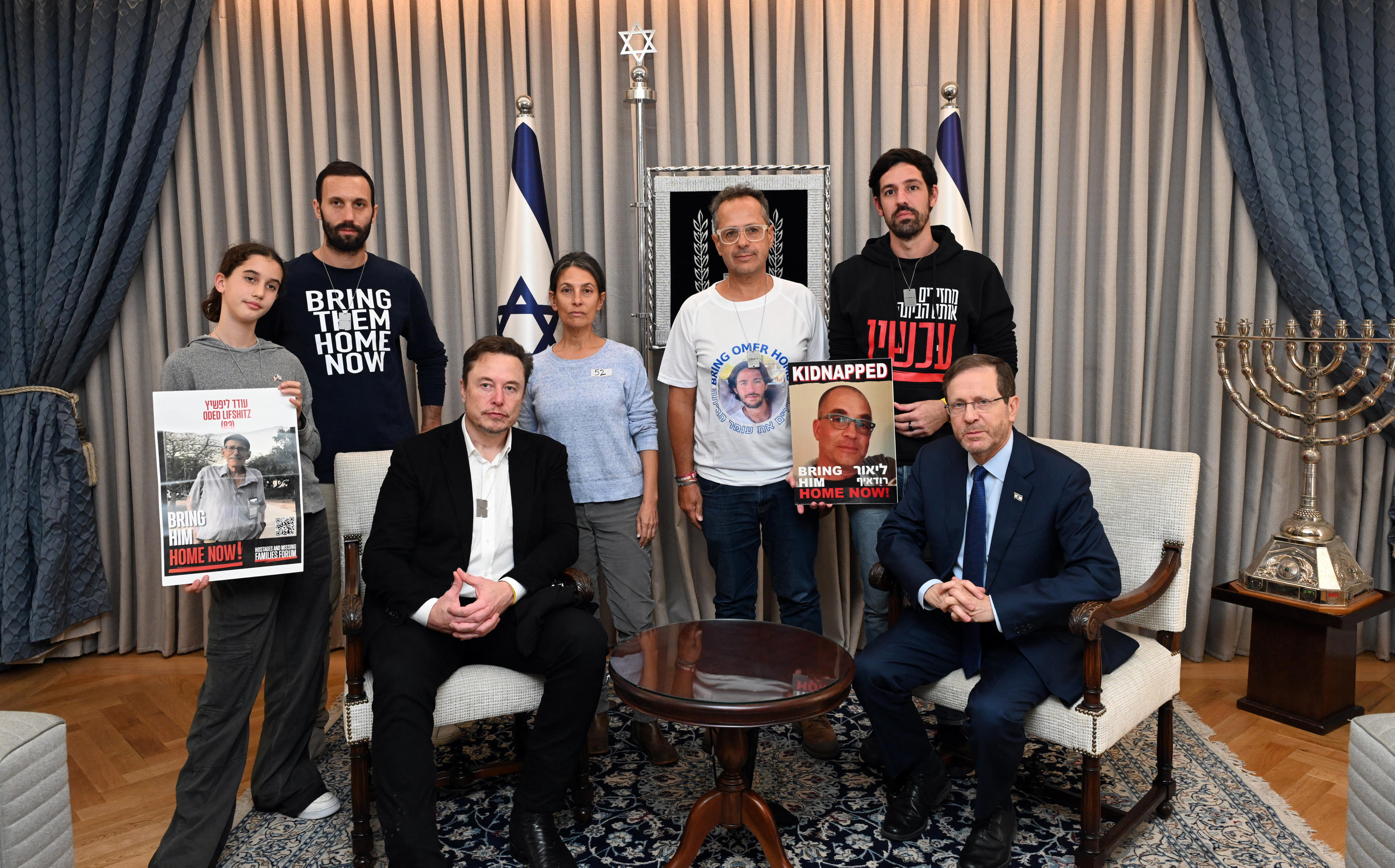
Elon Musk in Israel, meeting with President Isaac Herzog and representatives of the families of hostages held in Gaza, November 27, 2023

Musk's comments and actions have received condemnation from some of the governments and leaders for his involvement in European politics, including former UK Prime Minister Keir Starmer, President of France Emmanuel Macron, former Chancellor of Germany Olaf Scholz, and Prime Minister of Norway Jonas Gahr Store.

He has been critical of Israel's actions in the Gaza Strip during the Gaza war, praised China's economic and climate goals, suggested that Taiwan and China should resolve Cross-strait relations in China's favor, and was described as having a close relationship with the Chinese government. In Europe, Musk expressed support for Ukraine in 2022 during the Russian invasion, but later backtracked, recommending Ukraine cede its Russia-occupied territories, often mocking Zelenskyy, and supported the far-right Alternative for Germany in Germany in 2024.

Regarding British politics, Musk blamed the 2024 UK riots on mass migration and open borders, criticized Starmer for what he described as a "two-tier" policing system, suggested British politician Jess Phillips should be imprisoned, and that Starmer was complicit in child sexual exploitation. Musk was subsequently invoked as being responsible for spreading misinformation and amplifying the far-right. He has also voiced his support for far-right activist Tommy Robinson and pledged electoral support for Reform UK.

In February 2026, Musk described Spanish Prime Minister Pedro Sánchez as a "tyrant" following Sánchez's proposal to prohibit users under the age of 16 from accessing social media.

== Conspiracy theories ==
Avatar of Elon Musk

Elon Musk
(@elonmusk)
tweeted:

Didn't the story come from @bellingcat, which literally specializes in psychological operations? I don't want to hurt their feelings, but this is either the weirdest story ever or a very bad psyop!

May 9, 2023

In November 2022, Musk shared a right-wing fake news website which promoted a conspiracy theory about the attack on Paul Pelosi. The following year, in the wake of a mass shooting at an outlet mall in Allen, Texas, Musk baselessly tried to cast doubt on evidence collected by journalists regarding the shooter's political beliefs, describing the event as a "psyop". Musk doubled down on his denial of the evidence that the shooter was a white supremacist in a CNBC interview 10 days later. Musk also boosted a tweet promoting an antisemitic blood libel conspiracy theory about adrenochrome, frequently invoked as part of QAnon.

In November 2023, Musk endorsed a tweet referencing an antisemitic conspiracy theory that "hordes of minorities" are infiltrating Western countries and that Jews are pushing hatred against white people. The White House condemned Musk's endorsement of the tweet as "unacceptable". He also shared a meme promoting the widely discredited far-right Pizzagate conspiracy theory, and after a few hours, Musk deleted the tweet.

Starting in December 2024, Musk fixed his attention on USAID, after watching an episode of Joe Rogan's podcast with Mike Benz railing against it, leading to the agency's demise.

== Finance and taxes ==
Musk has spoken against a proposed wealth tax and said that in general he supported estate taxes. He is also opposed to Grantor Retained Annuity Trusts. In 2024 Musk called a proposal from the British government to increase estate taxes on farms valued at more than a million pounds "going full Stalin." Musk is an opponent of short-selling, has repeatedly criticized the practice, and argued it should be illegal. He has engaged with short-selling critics via social media and used Tesla merchandise as a means of mocking those who short the Tesla stock.

On the topic of subsidizing renewable energy, Musk has stated that he does not believe the U.S. government should provide subsidies to companies but should instead use a carbon tax to price in the negative externality of climate change and discourage poor behavior. Musk believes that the free market would achieve the best solution, and that producing environmentally unfriendly vehicles should come with its own consequences. Musk has advocated against funding for charging stations in the Infrastructure Investment and Jobs Act, maintaining that oil and gas subsidies should also be eliminated. Vermont Senator Bernie Sanders refuted Musk, describing his hypocrisy for receiving "billions in corporate welfare" before opposing a $2 trillion stimulus package that included provisions for specific companies and interest groups. Musk has subsequently doubled down on his stance and called for ending the US $7,500 tax credit for buyers of electric cars.

== Philosophy and religion ==
=== Natalism ===
Avatar of Elon Musk

Elon Musk
(@elonmusk)
tweeted:

Population collapse due to low birth rates is a much bigger risk to civilization than global warming

August 26, 2022

Musk holds strong pronatalist views; The Guardian has characterized Musk as "The world's most famous pronatalist", and according to The Wall Street Journal, he has had at least 14 children with four women. Musk believes that vaginal delivery result in reduced skull size and as a result supports routine cesarean sections over natural births.

Speaking at The Wall Street Journal's CEO Council session in 2021, Musk stated that a declining birth rate, and consequent population decline, is one of the biggest risks to human civilization. The following year, he argued that population collapse, due to low birth rates, is a superior risk to civilization than global warming, and his views on population collapse were challenged by demographers. In 2023, Musk has asserted that declining birth rates pose an existential threat to humanity and has donated ten million dollars to the University of Texas at Austin to further research on the potential risks. Musk has also argued that "smart" people in particular are not having children, a view which has been criticized as too close to eugenics. Speaking about natalism in 2024 Musk said "You've got to walk the talk, so I do have a lot of kids and I encourage others to have lots of kids."

=== Religion ===
Avatar of Elon Musk

Elon Musk
(@elonmusk)
tweeted:

I believe in the principles of Christianity like love thy neighbor as thyself (have empathy for all) and turn the other cheek (end the cycle of retribution)

July 27, 2024

Musk was raised in the Anglican Church, in which he was baptized. In 2013, when he was asked if he thought that science and religion could co-exist, Musk replied "Probably not", and in 2017 he denounced a plan to create a religion which is based on the worship of an artificially intelligent 'Godhead'. By 2023, Musk had said that he considers himself "aspirationally Jewish", and noted the influence that his attending a Hebrew preschool had on him. The following year, Musk tweeted about Christianity, stating he is a believer in the principles of Christianity, such as love thy neighbor as thyself and turn the other cheek. He also engaged in a viral two-hour conversation with Jordan Peterson that explored various topics, including the role of Christianity in his life. During the interview, he described himself as a "cultural Christian". In 2024, Musk stated that he is a "big believer in the principles of Christianity".
