= International relations of Elon Musk =

Elon Musk is the owner of multiple companies, the wealthiest individual in the world, and a former United States special government employee. Musk's comments and actions have received condemnation from some of the governments and leaders for his involvement in European politics, including UK Prime Minister Keir Starmer, President of France Emmanuel Macron, Chancellor of Germany Olaf Scholz, Prime Minister of Norway Jonas Gahr Store, and Ukrainian President Volodymyr Zelenskyy.

He has been critical of Israel's actions in the Gaza Strip during the Gaza war, praised China's economic and climate goals, suggested that Taiwan and China should resolve cross-strait relations in China's favor, and was described as having a close relationship with the Chinese government. In Europe, Musk expressed support for Ukraine in 2022 during the Russian invasion, recommended referendums and peace deals on the annexed Russia-occupied territories, and supported the far-right Alternative for Germany in Germany in 2024.

Regarding British politics, Musk blamed the 2024 UK riots on mass migration and open borders, criticized Prime Minister Starmer for what he described as a "two-tier" policing system, suggested British politician Jess Phillips should be imprisoned, and that Starmer was complicit in child sexual exploitation. Musk was subsequently attacked for spreading misinformation and amplifying the far-right. He has also voiced his support for far-right activist Tommy Robinson, and initially pledged financial backing to Reform UK ahead of the next general election. In January 2025, he publicly fell out with Reform UK leader Nigel Farage, calling for Farage to be replaced as party leader. Musk subsequently shifted his backing towards Restore Britain, the political party launched by Rupert Lowe.

== Background ==
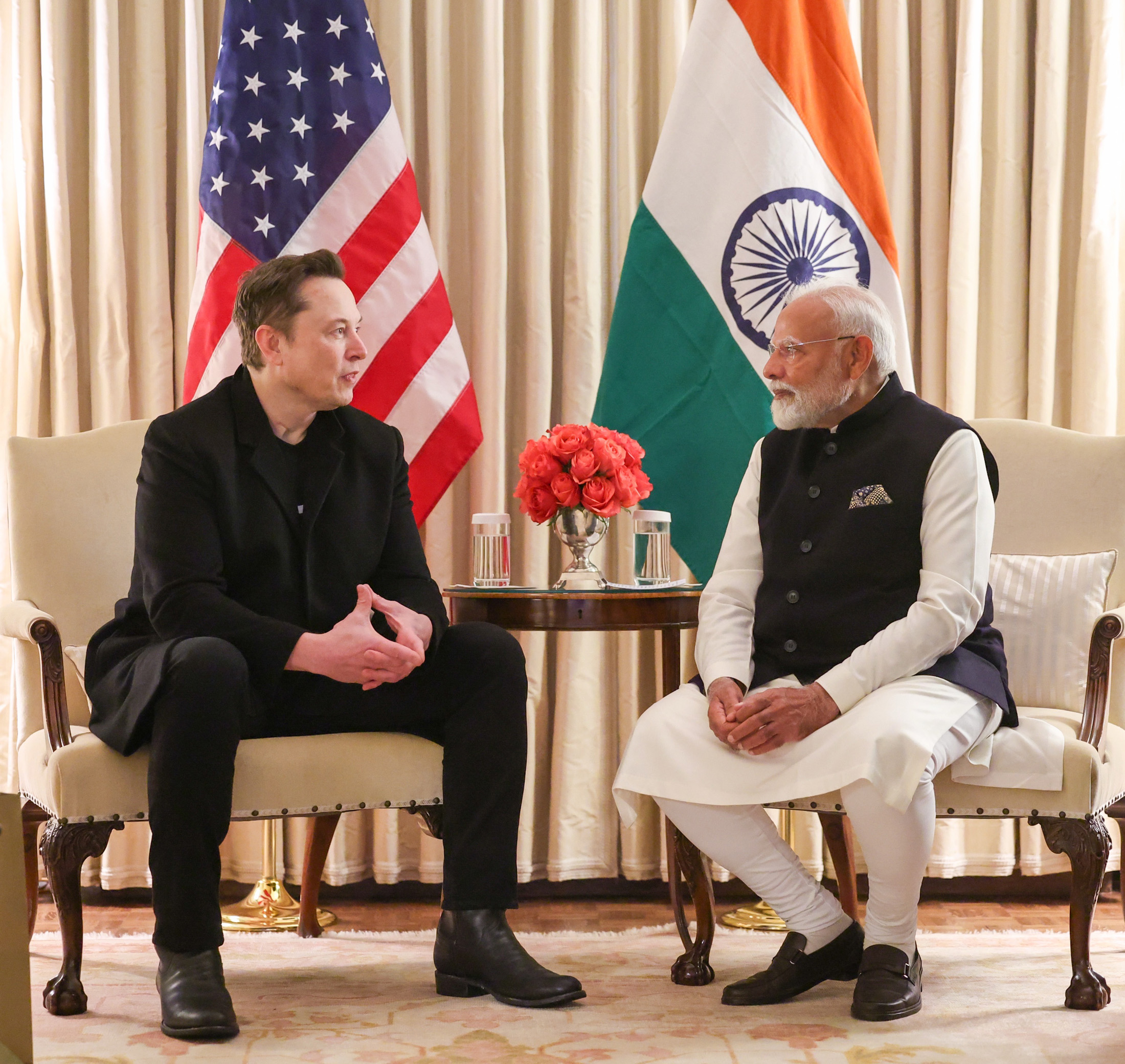
Musk with Indian Prime Minister Narendra Modi in Washington, D.C. on February 13, 2025

Musk has been described as being closely associated with techno-libertarians, ideologically a libertarian authoritarian, and has more recently been described as far-right in regards to European politics. Having criticized and feuded with Donald Trump, Musk supported Trump for the 2024 United States presidential election as the largest financial contributor to his campaign. Soon after, by appointment of Trump, Musk was given "special government employee" status as the de facto head of the Department of Government Efficiency (DOGE). Describing himself as "a free speech absolutist", Musk has regularly criticized American and European immigration policies, and his views on transgender issues, women, and race, have been controversial. Musk advocates for the U.S. to withdraw from both NATO and the United Nations.

== Bolivia ==
Avatar of Elon Musk

Elon Musk
(@elonmusk)
tweeted:

We will coup whoever we want! Deal with it.

July 24, 2020

In July 2020, Musk tweeted, "We will coup whoever we want" in response to a Twitter user who implied that the US government organized a coup (referring to the 2019 Bolivian political crisis) against Evo Morales for Musk to obtain lithium from Bolivia. Musk's tweet caused controversy and was later deleted.

== Canada ==
In January 2022, Musk tweeted "Canadian truckers rule", endorsing the Canada convoy protest, branded as the "Freedom Convoy" by its organizers. Musk tweeted extensively in support of the protest, which began as a denunciation of COVID-19 vaccine mandates for truck drivers crossing the Canada–United States border, but morphed into being against COVID-19 restrictions in general.

In February, apparently supporting the protest, Musk tweeted and later deleted a meme comparing Canadian prime minister Justin Trudeau to Adolf Hitler. That same month, Auschwitz-Birkenau State Museum portrayed Musk as having exploited the tragedy of the Holocaust, and the American Jewish Committee asked Musk to apologize.

In October 2026, two days after the 2026 Quebec general election, Musk said that he supports the independence of Quebec, the independence of Alberta and the independence of Saskatchewan.

== China ==
Avatar of Elon Musk

Elon Musk
(@elonmusk)
tweeted:

The economic prosperity that China has achieved is truly amazing, especially in infrastructure! I encourage people to visit and see for themselves.

July 1, 2021

Musk has praised China's economic and climate goals and has been described as having a close relationship with the Chinese government, allowing access to its markets for Tesla. After Gigafactory Shanghai produced its first batch of vehicles, Musk thanked the Chinese government and Chinese people while criticizing the United States and its people. In an interview in December 2020, Musk stated that based on his experience with the government of China, they have been "possibly more responsive to the happiness of people than in the U.S." On the 100th anniversary of the founding of the Chinese Communist Party, Musk praised China's "economic prosperity" and encouraged people to visit China.

To that end, any area that contributes to a sustainable future is worthy of our investment. Whether it's Tesla, Neuralink, or SpaceX, these companies were all founded with the ultimate goal of enhancing the future of human life and creating as much practical value for the world as possible — Tesla to accelerate the world's transition to sustainable energy, Neuralink for medical rehabilitation, SpaceX for making interstellar connections possible.

— Elon Musk and Eric Jing Xiandong, contributing to Cyber Space, July 2022

In 2022, Musk wrote an article for the official publication of Cyberspace Administration of China, advocating for transition to sustainable and clean energy. His contribution was described by The Verge as conflicting with his advocacy for free speech due to the organization's enforcement of Internet censorship in China. In 2024, Musk described himself as "kind of pro-China", and a year later, during a visit to Beijing, he declared he was a "huge fan of China."

In December 2024, US Representative Rosa DeLauro declared that Musk had pressured House Republicans to remove a restriction on investment in China from a bipartisan government funding bill. Musk responded that DeLauro was an "awful person" who "needs to be expelled from Congress." The following month, Musk stated that "the current situation where TikTok is allowed to operate in America, but X is not allowed to operate in China, is unbalanced".

In January 2025, Musk's relations with China were criticized by Republican Senator Tom Cotton in a book. Cotton wrote that Musk was too close to the Chinese government and too focused on turning a profit in China. In March 2025, the Financial Times and ProPublica reported that wealthy Chinese investors had invested in Musk's private companies via special-purpose entities in the Cayman Islands that avoided public disclosure.

In September 2026, just before Chinese leader Xi Jinping's state visit to the United States, Musk gave an interview with the China Central Television, where he praised Xi, saying "He seems like a great leader. Under his tenure, China has prospered immensely. I’ve seen it first hand" and that "And it’s also obvious to see just walking around the streets, the … prosperity of the average Chinese citizen has increased tremendously. All that seems to happen under President Xi while he’s been the leader of China. So he’s clearly done an excellent job and is very capable." He said "China just has a very strong, inherent ability to do manufacturing. Well, this has been true not just in the present day" and praised Gigafactory Shanghai. He praised China's capabilities in AI, saying "the Chinese AI models are generally outstanding" and that China was "by far the best in terms of performance per unit of compute", and predicted China would "address the compute limitation faster than most people expect". He also praised China's high-speed rail and recommended people to visit the country, saying "Any words I say do not do justice to the incredible majesty that is China. It’s awesome".

== Germany ==
Avatar of Elon Musk

Elon Musk
(@elonmusk)
tweeted:

Only the AfD can save Germany

December 20, 2024

In 2023, German politicians asserted that Musk was endorsing the Alternative for Germany (AfD), with Musk denying any support for the AfD. In December 2024, Musk tweeted in support of the AfD for Germany and published an opinion piece supporting the AfD in the German newspaper Welt am Sonntag.

There is too much focus on past guilt, and we need to move beyond that, [...] It's good to be proud of German culture, German values, and not to lose that in some sort of multiculturalism that dilutes everything.

— Elon Musk, speaking virtually at an Alternative for Germany (AfD) event, January 2025

In January 2025, Musk held an interview on X with AfD leader Alice Weidel, ahead of the federal elections. Musk said that his views were shaped by personal experiences dealing with German regulation and his observations about its political culture. He subsequently made a surprise virtual appearance at an AfD event, describing the party as "the best hope" for Germany, while denouncing multiculturalism. According to The Wall Street Journal, Musk has been "souring" on Germany and its leaders long before December 2024. Tesla's sales in Germany during this time period fell 60%.

== Israel and Gaza ==
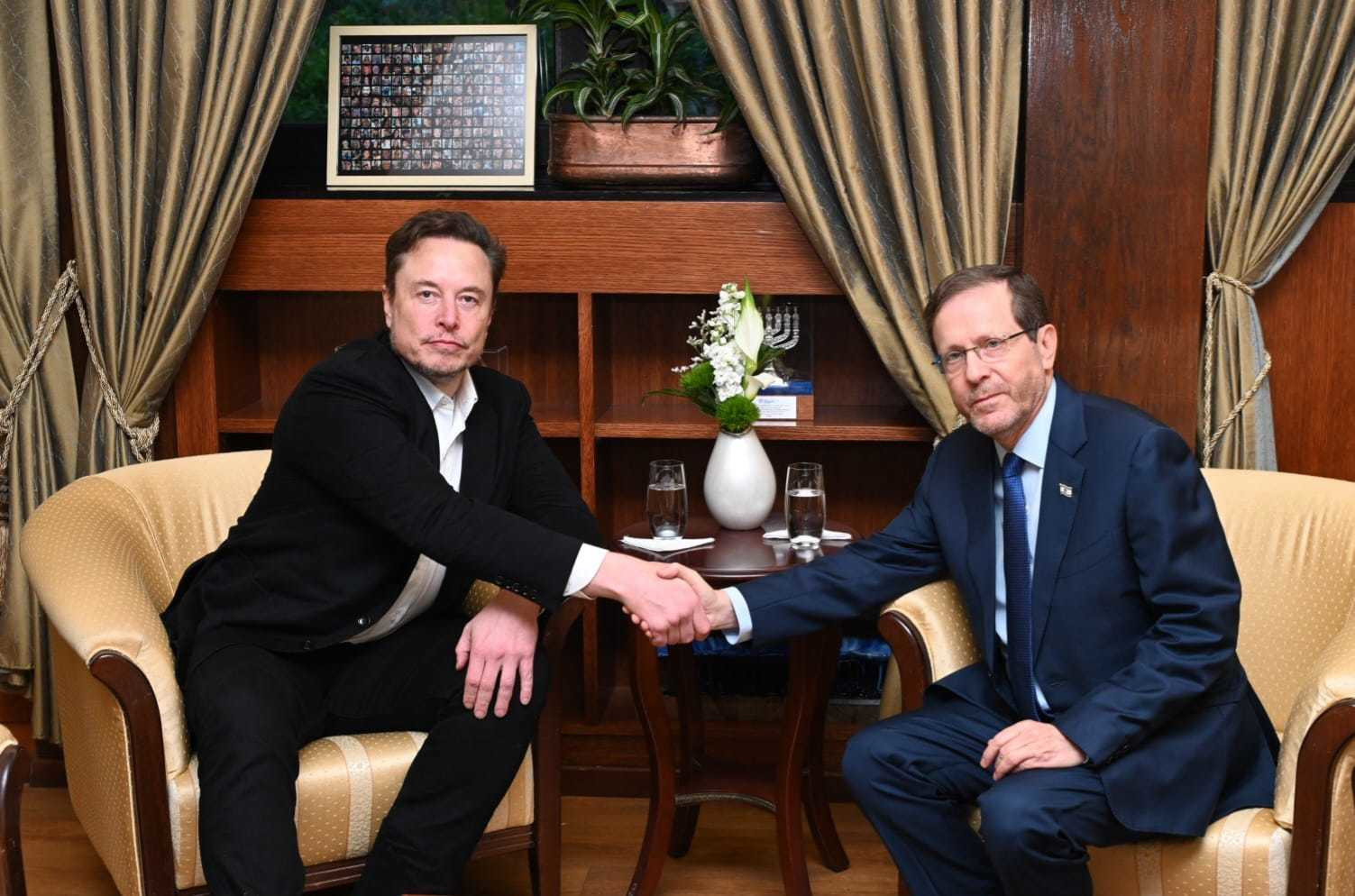
Musk with the President of Israel Isaac Herzog at the Beit HaNassi, November 2023

In a podcast interview in November 2023, Musk criticized Israel's actions in the Gaza Strip during the Gaza war, saying that Hamas "wanted to commit the worst atrocities that they could in order to provoke the most aggressive response possible from Israel." He also announced a policy change on the X platform, stating that users who use terms like "decolonization" and "from the river to the sea", or similar expressions that, according to him, imply genocide of the Jewish people in Israel, will be suspended.

Israeli prime minister Benjamin Netanyahu has defended Musk after Musk's salute controversy, claiming that Musk is a "great friend of Israel".

== Russia and Ukraine ==
Avatar of Elon Musk

Elon Musk
(@elonmusk)
tweeted:

Ukraine-Russia Peace:

- Redo elections of annexed regions under UN supervision. Russia leaves if that is will of the people.

- Crimea formally part of Russia, as it has been since 1783 (until Khrushchev's mistake).

- Water supply to Crimea assured.

- Ukraine remains neutral.

October 3, 2022

Immediately following the Russian invasion of Ukraine in early 2022, Musk tweeted "Hold Strong Ukraine" and sympathized with the people of Russia, after which Ukrainian President Volodymyr Zelenskyy thanked Musk.

In October 2022, Musk suggested that Ukraine should permanently cede occupied territories (e.g. Crimea) to Russia, and that Ukraine should drop its bid to join NATO. The four-part proposal, posted as a Twitter poll, suggested new referendums under United Nations supervision on the annexation of Russia-occupied territories. The proposal was welcomed by the Russian government and denounced by Zelenskyy as "pro-Russia", with officials stating that people who had been murdered or forcibly deported by Russia would be unable to vote.

According to American foreign affairs specialist Fiona Hill, Musk appeared to be "transmitting a message" for Putin. In Politico's interview with Hill, she said that Musk's suggestion that Kherson and Zaporizhzhia be up for negotiation, and that the water supply for Crimea be secured, was specifically a message from Putin. Musk previously made a similar suggestion at a September event in Aspen, Colorado. Musk has repeatedly expressed concern that a protracted war between Russia and Ukraine could lead to the use of nuclear weapons and the outbreak of World War III.

[Musk] is in a position to command government contracts, potentially with a government position, and there are loads of militaries around the world dependent on his systems, not least Ukraine.

— Fiona Hill, foreign affairs advisor, October 2024

In an email newsletter, Ian Bremmer, head of Eurasia Group, a political-risk consultancy, said that Musk told him that he had spoken directly with Putin, which Musk denied in a reply on Twitter. Musk claimed he had spoken to Putin only once 18 months prior, on a space-related subject matter. Bremmer later took to Twitter to say Musk had told him two weeks earlier about the discussion with Putin. Kremlin spokesman Dmitry Peskov called it "untrue", claiming Musk and Putin had only spoken about a year and a half before. In 2024, The Wall Street Journal reported that Musk and Putin had been in regular contact since 2022. Peskov again stated that Musk and Putin have only had one telephone call in which they discussed "space as well as current and future technologies."

Since the Russian invasion in early 2022, Ukraine has been reliant on Musk's Starlink satellite internet service for communications. In 2023, Ukraine requested Musk enable Starlink up to Crimea for use in an attack against the Russian fleet in Sevastopol. Musk denied the request, expressing concerns about escalation. Musk's stance has been criticized in Ukraine because of the effect it had on their battlefield strategy. The New York Times underscored that Musk's actions had directly impacted Ukraine's attempts to defend itself and reclaim its territory.

In October 2023, Musk used a meme on X to mock Ukrainian president Volodymyr Zelenskyy and U.S. aid being sent to Ukraine. "So you have bought social media to bully people who are dying because [they] love freedom," Ukrainian stand-up comedian Anton Tymoshenko wrote in response.

== South Africa ==
In March 2025 Musk claimed that Starlink was unavailable in South Africa because he was not black. The South African government argued against this. Later in March Musk posted a video to X of Economic Freedom Fighters (EFF) leader Julius Malema singing the controversial Apartheid-era song Dubul' ibhunu with a caption expressing his outrage at “a major political party … that is actively promoting white genocide”. US President Donald Trump then reposted Musk's comment on his own Truth Social along with his own condemnation of the song and a request that the South African government “protect Afrikaner and other disfavored minorities” as well as inviting Afrikaners to immigrate to the United States.

In May 2025 he attended the Trump–Ramaphosa Oval Office meeting.

== Spain ==
On February 3, 2026, Spanish Prime Minister Pedro Sánchez announced plans to restrict access to social media platforms for users under the age of 16 during the World Governments Summit in Dubai. Following the announcement, Musk responded by labeling Sánchez a "tyrant" and a "fascist totalitarian."

== Taiwan ==
My recommendation ... would be to figure out a special administrative zone for Taiwan that is reasonably palatable, probably won't make everyone happy. And it's possible, and I think probably, in fact, that they could have an arrangement that's more lenient than Hong Kong.

— Elon Musk, speaking to The Financial Times, October 2022

In October 2022, Musk suggested that Taiwan and China should "figure out a special administrative zone" arrangement as a potential resolution to the political status of Taiwan, and the suggestion drew cross-party criticism from Taiwanese lawmakers. Chen Shih-chung commented that Musk had "brought about revolutionary change" and called on Musk to hold himself to the same democratic values regarding Taiwan." Chinese Ambassador to the United States Qin Gang thanked Musk for his suggestion.

The official policy of China is that Taiwan should be integrated. One does not need to read between the lines, one can simply read the lines,

— Elon Musk, interview with CNBC, May 2023

In May 2023, when asked if he was concerned that China could attempt to take control of Taiwan, Musk remarked that "Taiwan should be integrated", according to the official policy of China, Taiwan's Foreign Minister Joseph Wu tweeted at Musk in response, and China Daily ran the headline "Elon Musk: Taiwan should be integrated". In September 2023, at the All-In Summit in Los Angeles, Musk again stated that Taiwan was part of China likening it to Hawaii, again receiving significant criticism, with Wu tweeting that Taiwan was not for sale, and U.S. congressmen Andy Ogles and Randy Weber published an open letter challenging Musk's interpretation of history and his exposure to the Chinese Communist Party. In 2024 Musk praised the quality of Taiwan's engineering talent.

== United Kingdom ==
Avatar of Elon Musk

Elon Musk
(@elonmusk)
tweeted:

Why aren't all communities protected in Britain? @Keir_Starmer

August 6, 2024

In August 2024, after UK Prime Minister Keir Starmer said "large social media companies and those who run them" were contributing to the riots taking place in the country, Musk criticized him for not condemning all participants in the riots and only blaming the far-right. Musk also responded to a tweet which said the riots were due to "mass migration and open borders". His comments were condemned by Starmer's official spokesman. He further criticized Starmer for what he described as a "two-tier" policing system that did not protect all communities in the United Kingdom, and subsequently shared a conspiracy theory that Starmer's government was planning to build detainment camps in the Falkland Islands to hold far-right rioters. In response, Starmer stated his focus was safe communities and the importance of supporting police officers.

Avatar of Elon Musk

Elon Musk
(@elonmusk)
tweeted:

The Reform Party needs a new leader. Farage doesn't have what it takes.

January 5, 2025

In December 2024, The Times reported that Musk was planning to donate $100 million to Nigel Farage's Reform UK party ahead of the next UK election, and may route the funds through X's UK branch to bypass donation laws. The following month, Musk called for a new election in the UK, saying "only Reform can save Britain". Musk has called for far-right activist Tommy Robinson to be released from prison and supports the resignation of Nigel Farage as leader of Reform UK believing he "doesn't have what it takes".

Those who are cheerleading Tommy Robinson are not interested in justice. They're supporting a man who went to prison for nearly collapsing a grooming case, a gang grooming case. These are people who are trying to get some vicarious thrill from street violence that people like Tommy Robinson promote.

— UK Prime Minister Keir Starmer (Note: Starmer said: "When politicians, and I mean politicians, who sat in government for many years are casual about honesty, decency, truth and the rule of law, calling for inquiries because they want to jump on a bandwagon of the far-right, then that affects politics because a robust debate can only be based on the true facts and that is why this is actually an important point about our politics, not about what anybody may or may not say on Twitter. My fight to change the way that the prosecution service operated is a matter of public record. Making sure the men responsible for these despicable acts were brought to justice. Put in the dock... then behind bars. That is why I brought the first prosecution for a grooming gang. Far-right voices have tried to rewrite history. Those spreading lies and misinformation are not interested in the victims. Those cheerleading for Tommy Robinson - a thug who was jailed for almost collapsing a grooming case - are not interested in justice. They are only interested in themselves."), January 2025

In January 2025, after Kemi Badenoch called for a national inquiry into group-based child sexual exploitation, Musk suggested Phillips was attempting to shield Starmer from blame since he led the Crown Prosecution Service when the abuse occurred. Musk's comments were criticized, and Phillips was defended by a group of victims of gender-based violence, including three survivors of the Telford child sexual exploitation scandal, as well as the Health Secretary Wes Streeting and Starmer, who said politicians and activists were "spreading lies and misinformation" over grooming gangs. Phillips said Musk was spreading "disinformation" that was endangering her. Musk also suggested Starmer was "complicit" in group-based child sexual exploitation. Starmer was head of the CPS in 2009 when a decision was made not to prosecute an individual who was part of the Rochdale child sex abuse ring; however, there is no evidence Starmer was personally involved in the decision. Starmer said politicians advocating for a second national inquiry were "amplifying" the far-right, and said those "spreading misinformation are not interested in the victims".
