= Libertarian authoritarianism =

Syncretism of right-libertarianism and authoritarianism

Libertarian authoritarianism is a political syncretic formation that merges aspects of both right-libertarianism and authoritarianism, which has been emerging in the politics of Europe and of the United States.

== Analysis ==
In 2018, political scientist Wendy Brown, summarized libertarian authoritarianism as "a novel political formation that is an inadvertent effect of neoliberal rationality" within the context of American politics, right-wing populism, and as part of "a further reconfiguration of neoliberalism".

In 2023, the New Statesman described the fundamental basis of libertarian authoritarianism to be based in "post-truth politics", and that in the late-modern era believers validate their opinions "with proto-scientific evidence, rumours, conspiracy theories and fake news". The British magazine described neoliberalism as an additional factor contributing towards the recent rise of the ideology, with modern adherents to the ideology including Peter Thiel, Elon Musk, and Javier Milei, having merged their libertarianism with their "authoritarian tendencies".

In 2025, Jacobin defined libertarian authoritarians as those who believe in the abolition of the democratic state, on the basis of its restrictions on individual freedoms, and "consider the democratic state itself, the authorities and their regulations, to be invasive and harmful". The theory has also been referenced by the Journal of European Public Policy within the framework of German politics and the COVID-19 protests.

== See also ==
- Dark Enlightenment
- Fusionism
- Hans-Hermann Hoppe
- National-anarchism
- Paleolibertarianism
- Pinochetism
