= USAID in the second Trump administration =

Dismantling and transfer of USAID under Donald Trump

During the second presidency of Donald Trump, the United States Agency for International Development (USAID), the principal U.S. government agency for administering civilian foreign aid and development programs, underwent sweeping staff and program reductions. Its remaining programs were transferred to the United States Department of State. In January 2025, President Donald Trump ordered a review and near-total freeze on foreign assistance. The administration subsequently placed most USAID employees on administrative leave, terminated thousands of grants and contracts, and announced that 83% of the agency's programs would be canceled. U.S. secretary of state Marco Rubio, who became acting administrator of USAID, oversaw the transfer of the remaining programs to the State Department. USAID's independent operations ended on July 1, 2025, by which time 94% of its staff had been laid off.

Elon Musk and personnel associated with the Department of Government Efficiency participated in implementing the administration's early actions involving the agency. The foreign-aid freeze, workforce reductions, program cancellations and transfer of functions prompted lawsuits by employee unions, aid organizations, contractors and grant recipients. The lawsuits challenged the administration's authority to suspend congressionally appropriated funding and dismantle or transfer the functions of an agency established by Congress.

The funding reductions and program cancellations disrupted humanitarian relief, food-security systems, global-health programs, clinical trials, disease surveillance, and other international-development work. A retrospective evaluation and forecasting analysis published in The Lancet estimated that if the funding reductions continued through 2030, they could result in more than 14 million additional deaths, including approximately 4.5 million among children younger than five, although this estimate is disputed. The Impact Counter later attributed 781,343 deaths, including 518,428 children, to the first year of funding cuts.

== Timeline of staffing and policy changes ==
=== Initial 90-day freeze ===
On January 24, 2025, during the second Trump administration, President Donald Trump ordered a near-total freeze on all foreign aid.

Several days later, U.S. Secretary of State Marco Rubio issued a waiver for humanitarian aid, referred to as Lifesaving Humanitarian Aid (LHA). However, there was uncertainty as to whether the LHA waiver was actually translating into aid flowing, and there was still considerable confusion about what agencies should do.

On January 27, 2025, the agency's official government website was shut down.

=== Layoffs and firings ===
In early February 2025, more than 1,000 USAID employees and contractors were fired or furloughed following the near-total freeze on U.S. global assistance that had been implemented. The administration then placed most remaining USAID employees on administrative leave. Multiple lawsuits were filed against the Trump administration alleging that those actions were not within its powers without congressional authorization. On February 6, 2025, reports indicated that the total number of employees to be retained was 294, out of a total of more than 10,000.

Trump declared that agency leaders were "radical left lunatics", while the State Department ordered them to halt virtually all of their projects, even if that meant shutting down programs that had helped to eradicate smallpox and prevented millions of HIV cases.

Also in February, the administration made several allegations of wasteful spending and fraud. An analysis by Al Jazeera reported the claims regarding fraud to be unsubstantiated. An analysis by The Washington Post found most of the claims made by the administration regarding USAID spending to be misleading.

=== March USAID internal memo ===
A USAID internal memo, dated March 4, 2025, written by Nicholas Enrich, Acting Assistant Administrator for Global Health, outlined the risks of the aid freeze. He stated that a permanent suspension of lifesaving humanitarian aid posed a direct threat to public health, economic stability, national security and biothreat vulnerability. He concluded: "Any decision to halt or significantly reduce global health funding for lifesaving humanitarian assistance (LHA)—despite approved waivers—and USAID global health programming, despite congressional mandates, would have severe domestic and global consequences." Enrich was notified that he was put on administrative leave less than 30 minutes after the memo's publication, a decision that had reportedly been made a week prior.

=== Reduction to 17% of programs ===
On March 10, 2025, U.S. secretary of state Marco Rubio announced that the Trump administration had concluded its review, and 83% of USAID's programs would be cancelled, involving approximately 5,200 contracts.

=== Absorption by State Department ===
On March 28, 2025, U.S. secretary of state Marco Rubio notified Congress that USAID would be dissolved and absorbed into the U.S. State Department, stating that USAID had been fiscally irresponsible and strayed from original mission. He argued, "Unfortunately, USAID strayed from its original mission long ago. As a result, the gains were too few and the costs were too high."

Since July 1, 2025, USAID's operations have ceased and U.S. foreign assistance has now been administered by the U.S. State Department. In connection with this effort, 83% of USAID programs were canceled, and 94% of staff were laid off.

Representative Jim Himes (D-Conn.), the top Democrat on the House Intelligence Committee, stated as an example of what he viewed as abrupt and irresponsible cost-cutting: "Thanks to DOGE, the men we paid to guard the most vicious ISIS terrorists in the world in Syria walked off the job."

USAID employees were not automatically transferred. Instead, the State Department is engaging in a "separate and independent hiring process."

=== Proposed $5 billion dollar pocket rescission ===
In late August, President Trump informed House speaker Mike Johnson, that he would not spend $4.9 billion in foreign aid that Congress already approved. This is a "pocket rescission", in which a president announces money will not be spent shortly before the 30 September end of the fiscal year, preventing Congress from acting on his request within 45 days. The Guardian states this is the first time in 50 years such a rescission has been made.

In early September, a district judge ordered the Trump administration to spend those funds. On appeal, Chief Justice John Roberts, who handles emergency petitions for Washington DC, gave aid groups who had sued until September 12 to file a response.

Some of the money was scheduled to go to United Nations organizations and peacekeeping purposes, as well as projects of economic development assistance and democracy promotion.

=== Expansion of anti-abortion and anti-DEI policies ===
In mid-January 2026, the Trump administration adopted new stricter policies effective February 26, 2026, for both anti-abortion goals and anti-DEI goals (DEI stands for Diversity, Equity, and Inclusion). Since the Reagan administration in the 1980s, U.S. money could not be used for abortions. Each subsequent Democratic administration repealed that policy and each subsequent Republican administration put it back in place, as the Trump administration did early in his second term.

The new policy bars organizations that receive U.S. money from either performing or recommending abortions, even with non-U.S. money. In addition, the organization cannot promote DEI goals. The policy states that the banned activities are to "provide or promote abortion as a method of family planning; Promote gender ideology; Promote discriminatory equity ideology; or Engage in unlawful diversity, equity, and inclusion-related discrimination."

Secretary of State Marco Rubio can issue limited waivers so that the new policy will not "unduly disrupt ongoing lifesaving programming, disaster response, and other critical priorities."

A critic stated that the new policy "will affect access to safe spaces for survivors of gender-based violence, efforts to increase women's representation in peacebuilding initiatives, and a host of other work." The cable announcing the new policy stated that it is in line with the Trump administration's approach to focus "resources on programs that are designed to effectively and efficiently save lives, support allies, and create commercial opportunities that benefit the American economy."

== Key people ==
=== Role of Elon Musk ===
Elon Musk
(@elonmusk)
tweeted:

We spent the weekend feeding USAID into the wood chipper.

Could gone to some great parties.

Did that instead.

3 February 2025

The Washington Post, NBC News, The Nation, and The Atlantic, reported that Elon Musk fixed his attention on USAID since December 2024, after watching an episode of Joe Rogan's podcast with Mike Benz railing against it.

On January 30, 2025, Elon Musk demanded that Jason Gray, acting administrator of USAID at that time, shut off email and cellphone access for USAID workers around the world, including in conflict zones. Gray refused, saying that doing so would put their lives at risk. By the next day, Gray was removed from his post.

On February 3, 2025, Elon Musk, who has been carrying out parts of Trump's cost-cutting agenda, announced that he and Trump were in the process of shutting down USAID, claiming it to be a "criminal organization" and that it was "beyond repair". Because USAID's Inspector General had previously launched a probe into Starlink, Musk was criticized as having a conflict of interest.

Andrew Natsios, the administrator for USAID during the George W. Bush administration, told PBS that, "With all due respect, none of these people know anything about AID. What does Musk know about international development? Absolutely nothing. He has a bunch of young kids in their 20s. They don't know. They're techies. They don't know anything about international development. They don't know anything about the Global South."

=== Role of U.S. secretary of state Marco Rubio ===
On February 3, 2025, Secretary of State Marco Rubio announced his appointment as Acting Administrator of USAID by President Trump and that USAID was being merged into the State Department. The legality of these actions is disputed given the mandate for the agency's creation in the Foreign Assistance Act.

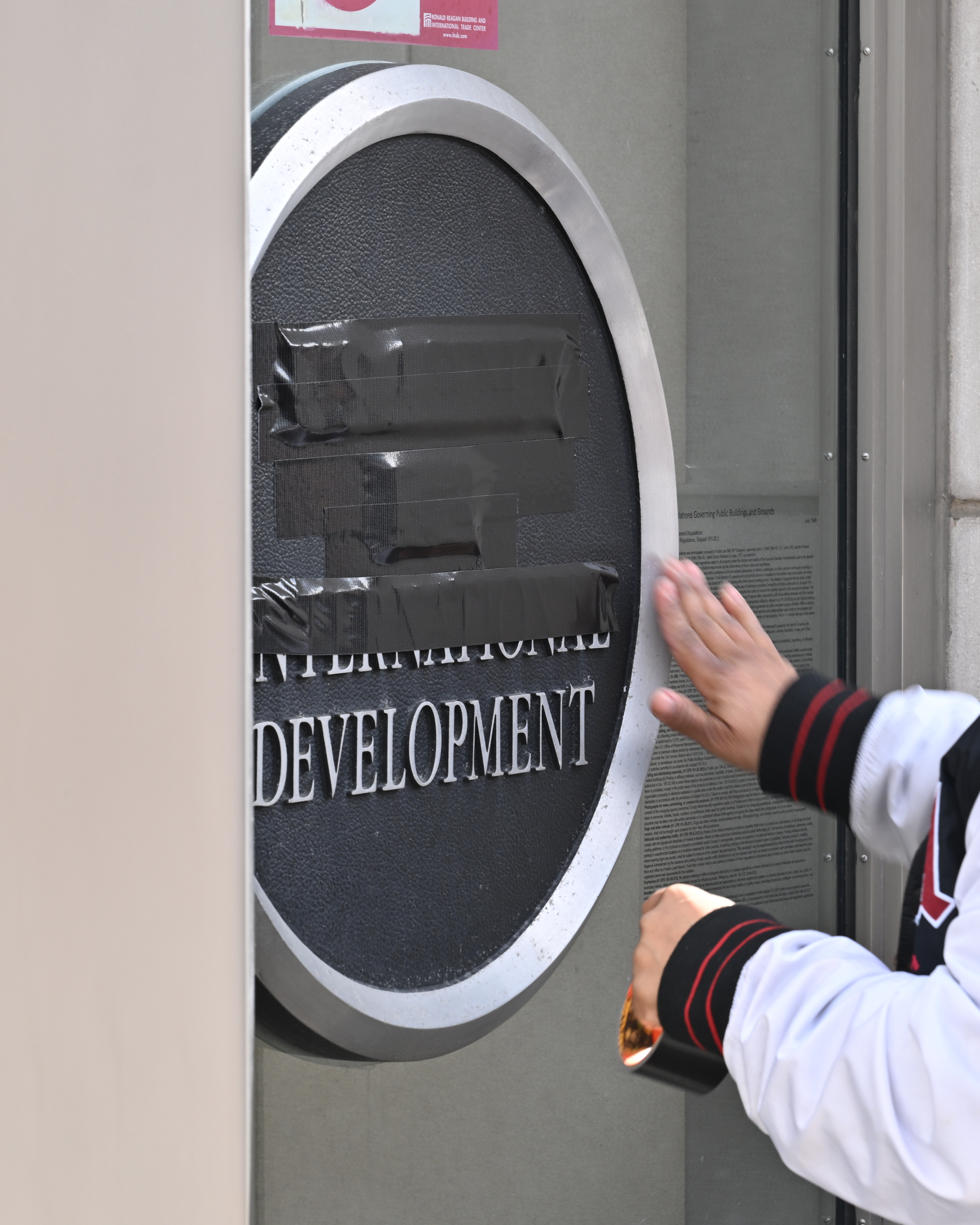
Taping over a USAID sign at the Ronald Reagan Building in Washington, DC on February 7, 2025

It was announced that on February 6, 2025, at 11:59 pm (EST) all USAID direct hire personnel would be placed on administrative leave globally, with the exception of designated personnel responsible for mission-critical functions, core leadership and specially designated programs.

=== Role of Mike Benz ===
Mike Benz, a far-right commentator, was linked to Elon Musk's attempt to dismantle USAID, according to various news organizations including The Washington Post, NBC News, and Last Week Tonight with John Oliver.

== Lawsuits ==
Case	Court	Case no.(s)	First filing date	Outcome	Notes
American Foreign Service Association, et al. v. Trump, et al.	U.S. District Court for the District of Columbia	1:25-cv-00352	February 6, 2025		
AIDS Vaccine Advocacy Coalition, et al. v. United States Department of State, et al.	U.S. District Court for the District of Columbia	1:25-cv-00400	February 10, 2025		
Global Health Council, et al. v. Trump, et al.	U.S. District Court for the District of Columbia	1:25-cv-00402	February 11, 2025		
J. Doe 1-26 v. Musk, et al.	U.S. District Court for the District of Maryland	8:25-cv-00462-TDC	February 13, 2025		See below
Personal Services Contractor Association v. Trump, et al.	U.S. District Court for the District of Columbia	1:25-cv-00469	February 18, 2025		

=== American Federation of Government Employees v. Trump ===
This lawsuit claimed the Trump administration had violated separation of powers, the Take Care Clause of the Constitution, and the Administrative Procedure Act. And initially, U.S. district judge Carl Nichols, whom Trump had nominated in 2019, stated he would enter in a temporary restraining order pausing the plan to put thousands of employees on leave and removing workers from abroad.

However, on February 21, 2025, Judge Nichols reversed himself and cleared the way for the Trump administration to move forward with thousands of layoffs of USAID staffers, as well as providing those abroad with a 30-day deadline to move back to the United States at government expense. Nichols had previously stated that these Trump administration policies threatened the safety of USAID workers abroad because many were deployed in unstable regions.

=== 5-4 Supreme Court decision that completed projects must be paid for ===
On February 10, 2025, the AIDS Vaccine Advocacy Coalition and the Journalism Development Network filed suit in District Court seeking a preliminary injunction that would prevent the enforcement of the 90-day freeze.

On February 13, 2025, a district court ruled that the government must pay $2 billion for projects already completed. On March 5, 2025, the United States Supreme Court ruled 5-4 that the federal government must pay for completed projects. Voting in the majority were the three Democratic appointees justices Sotomayor, Kagan, and Jackson, and Republican appointees Chief Justice Roberts and Justice Barrett. Voting in the minority were the four other Republican appointees justices Thomas, Alito, Gorsuch, and Kavanaugh. However, the district judge was ordered to proceed with "due regard for the feasibility of any compliance timelines."

On March 11, Associated Press reported that "until recently" no payments had been made because DOGE had disabled the payment system. On March 20, Reuters reported that the Trump administration was close to paying the $671 million owed for projects completed by the organizations that had sued.

=== Lawsuit that claimed Musk needed Senate confirmation ===
On March 18, 2025, U.S. district judge Theodore Chuang ruled that Musk's and DOGE's actions in placing USAID employees on leave were likely unconstitutional. Judge Chuang issued a preliminary injunction against further employees being placed on leave, buildings being closed, or websites having their contents deleted.

On March 28, 2025, the U.S. Fourth Circuit Court of Appeals overruled Judge Chuang on the preliminary injunction, without deciding the merits. Judge Marvin Quattlebaum wrote, "And none of this is to say that plaintiffs will not be able to develop evidence of unconstitutional conduct as the case progresses. Time will tell."

On August 18, 2025, Chuang certified the case as a class action on behalf of all USAID employees and personal services contractors who were employed by or contracted to the agency on January 27, 2025, rejecting the administration's argument that the class was overbroad.

In February 2026, Chuang ruled that Musk could be deposed about his role in shutting down USAID. The Trump administration petitioned the Fourth Circuit for a writ of mandamus, and on March 4, 2026, a divided panel granted it 2–1, directing the district court to issue a protective order barring the depositions of Musk and former officials Peter Marocco and Jeremy Lewin. The majority held that the lower court had abused its discretion, as the plaintiffs had not first sought the information through other means.

== Affected programs and impact ==
In July, Kelsey Piper writing for Vox argues that it is difficult to predict the extent to which other nonprofits and governments will take the place of USAID cuts. She notes that even the most rigorous research must make large assumptions, and contends that if the numbers are over-estimated, opponents may be able to "dismiss the entire foreign aid project as one run by politically motivated liars." Additionally, Piper said, "The White House has repeatedly lost when seeking congressional approval to dismantle our best-performing life-saving programs. So the administration has resorted to doing it piecewise and, as much as possible, avoiding a public debate."

Funding to SERVIR-Hindu Kush Himalaya, a disaster risk reduction initiative by USAID, NASA, and the International Centre for Integrated Mountain Development, was cut, ending the program in January 2025.

The impact of the demise of USAID on global health is wide-reaching, especially on low- and-middle-income countries.

=== Food aid and food security programs ===
==== Incineration of emergency food ====
In July 2025 The Atlantic reported that the order had been given to incinerate nearly 500 metric tons of emergency food. Citing former and current government employees, The Atlantic stated that USAID had already bought the food, some $800,000 of high-energy biscuits - a stopgap measure for feeding children under 5 - for the World Food Programme to distribute in Afghanistan and Pakistan. Instead, it remained in a warehouse in Dubai for months, where it was set to expire the day after the report; it would deteriorate quickly and be incinerated at a cost of $130,000.

Employees could no longer ship the food without the permission of the new heads of American foreign assistance. Permission had been requested repeatedly. The Atlantic cited the mentioned sources as saying that improper storage or delivery complications such as floods or terrorism might previously have cost the agency a few dozen tons of fortified foods a year at most, and that they had never before seen the U.S. government give up on food that could have been put to good use.

Secretary of State Marco Rubio testified before the House Appropriations Committee in May that the food would be distributed before it could spoil. The Atlantic's reporter stated the incineration order, which she had reviewed, had already gone out by the time of Rubio's testimony. The high-energy biscuits were estimated to be able to feed 1.5 million children for a week. The food was previously under the authority of Pete Marocco, and then under the authority of Jeremy Lewin.

==== Cuts to UN World Food Programme, and partial reversal ====
On April 8, 2025, USAID announced it was making some exceptions to the recent announcement of cancelled participation in the UN's World Food Programme. Specifically, USAID was restoring food aid to Lebanon, Syria, Somalia, Jordan, Iraq and Ecuador, and other countries for a total of 14 nations (plus the International Organization for Migration in the Pacific region). However, food aid was not restored to Yemen or Afghanistan with a State Department spokesperson saying this was "based on concern that the funding was benefiting terrorist groups, including the Houthis and the Taliban."

==== Famine Early Warning Systems ====
CNN reported on March 9 that the Famine Early Warning Systems Network (FEWS NET) had stopped operating and had its data pulled offline. FEWS NET had been considered the "gold standard" of famine warning, providing 8-month projections of food security issues.

The Integrated Food Security Phase Classification (IPC) is another early-warning system supported by various governments, including the United States. IPC uses volunteers for specific country analysis, whereas FEW NETS had used paid staff.

=== Clinical trials ===
This drastic action led to sudden pauses in over 30 clinical trials for ailments such as HIV, malaria, cholera, cervical cancer, and tuberculosis, leaving participants with medical devices in their bodies and cut off from researchers, likely going against the principles of the Declaration of Helsinki.

=== Breastfeeding and maternal health programs ===
USAID-funded breast feeding programs to reduce malnutrition in Nepal were brought to a halt following the aid freeze on January 20, 2025.

According to Pio Smith, UNFPA's Asia-Pacific regional director, the USAID freeze could lead to 1,200 maternal deaths and 109,000 additional unwanted pregnancies in the next three years in Afghanistan.

=== Infectious disease treatment and prevention programs ===
==== Gavi Foundation grant ====
On March 24, 2025, the Department of Government Efficiency (DOGE) announced the termination of a $2.63 billion grant from USAID to the Gavi Foundation because the Gavi Foundation "prioritizes 'zero-dose' children." DOGE stated the United States federal government saved $1.75 billion by cancelling the grant, which was a little less than 7% of the total USAID budget.

==== Waste of mpox vaccines ====
According to Africa CDC nearly 800,000 doses of mpox vaccine the Biden administration had pledged to donate to African countries could not be shipped because their remaining shelf life had fallen below six months, which Africa CDC described as the minimum time required to ship vaccines in order to ensure arrival in good condition and allow implementation. Politico noted that the loss of the shots came after the Trump administration cut back on foreign aid programs and closed USAID, and that although the U.S. had not disclosed their price, UNICEF described a price of "up to $65" per dose as "the lowest price in the market".

==== Malaria ====
The President's Malaria Initiative, started with help from George W. Bush, has contributed to a more than 60% reduction in malaria deaths, saved 7.6 million lives, and prevented 1.5 billion malaria cases globally between 2000 and 2019. PMI has supported malaria prevention and control for over 500 million at-risk people in Africa.

However, the USAID funding of PMI has been cut an estimated 47% as of June 2025. In countries such as the Democratic Republic of the Congo (DRC), these funds had supported the supply of antimalarial drugs to numerous health zones, including preventive treatments for pregnant women. Health officials in the DRC reported that the effects of these cuts were already being felt, with increased risk of severe illness and death from malaria among vulnerable populations. Former aid workers and experts also expressed concern that reduced funding undermined disease surveillance systems that help detect malaria and other outbreaks early. Such surveillance not only protects affected countries but also contributes to U.S. health security by limiting the global spread of disease. Aid organizations also highlighted how these cuts create a "vicious cycle", with malnutrition and malaria reinforcing one another. Reductions in U.S. support for nutrition programs increase children's vulnerability to malaria and other diseases, while higher malaria infections can worsen malnutrition.

==== PEPFAR ====
The January 2025 foreign aid freeze initially included PEPFAR, halting program activities. A waiver for essential medicines and medical services was granted on January 28, but it remained unclear whether it covered preventive drugs or other PEPFAR services, and later estimates indicated that only about half of PEPFAR programs restarted in February.

The disruption raised concern about access to HIV treatment and prevention services. Studies projected that a prolonged suspension of PEPFAR could cause millions of additional HIV infections and deaths.

In July 2025, Congress removed proposed PEPFAR cuts from a rescissions package, protecting $400 million in funding. However, media reports later said that Congress had approved $6 billion for PEPFAR for fiscal year 2025, while the Office of Management and Budget had made only $2.9 billion available for use. Data released in April 2026 showed that overall antiretroviral treatment access remained broadly stable from July to September 2025, but HIV testing, new diagnoses, treatment enrolment and prevention indicators had declined.

=== Contraceptives ===
In July 2025 Reuters, citing unnamed sources and a screenshot, reported that contraceptive implants, pills, and intrauterine devices worth $9.7 million would be incinerated.

Reuters had reported in June that contraceptives meant largely for vulnerable women in Sub-Saharan Africa, including young girls who face higher risks from pregnancy as well as those fleeing conflict or who could not otherwise afford or access contraceptives, had been warehoused in Belgium and Dubai for months following Trump's cuts to foreign aid and USAID. In its July article Reuters reported that the Belgian stockpile would be incinerated in France as medical waste, costing $160,000 and likely comprising "dozens of truckloads". The Belgium foreign ministry told Reuters it had "explored all possible options to prevent the destruction" and would keep trying. Reuters reported that the United Nations Population Fund (UNPFA) tried to buy the contraceptives. However, the fact that contraceptives were embossed with the USAID trademark was a problem, as was the way the U.S. could not ensure UNFPA would not share them with groups offering abortions, violating the Mexico City policy Trump had reinstated in January. Sarah Shaw, nonprofit MSI Reproductive Choices' Associate Director of Advocacy, told Reuters the organization had volunteered for pay for repackaging the supplies to remove USAID branding, shipping them, and for import duties, but the U.S. government declined, saying it would only sell the supplies at full market value. Shaw added that this was "clearly not about saving money." A source in this Reuters article concluded that "Washington did not want any USAID-branded supplies to be rerouted elsewhere."

Citing unnamed sources and an internal document listing warehouse stocks, Reuters reported the contraceptives were due to expire between April 2027 and September 2031.

== Regional impact ==
USAID cuts have impacted wartime assistance in Ukraine, hospital assistance in Syria, education programs in Mali, and conservation efforts in the Amazon rainforest.

=== Sudan ===
On February 6, 2025, CBS News reported that due to the civil war in Sudan, often called the "Forgotten War" because it receives comparatively little attention compared to the Ukraine and Gaza, an estimated 3 million children under age 5 are suffering from acute malnutrition. In September 2024, the Biden administration planned for $424 million in new humanitarian assistance for Sudanese persons, including $276 million being sent through USAID. However, the Trump administration's 90-day freeze interrupted this.

=== Humanitarian crisis in Haiti ===
In July 2025, the United Nations reported that the cut of USAID funding to Haiti represents a halt of approximately 80% of US-funded programmes. Food security, access to drinking water, primary healthcare, education and protection are all affected. Children are among the hardest hit. Modibo Traore, United Nations OCHA's country director in Haiti, said, "The withdrawal of US funding has led to a multidimensional regression in the rights of women and girls in Haiti."

=== Competition with China ===
Senator Roger Wicker (R-Mississippi) said, "I have felt for a long time that USAID is our way to combat the [$1 trillion] Belt and Road Initiative, which is China's effort to really gain influence around the world, including Africa and South America in the Western Hemisphere." In addition, China often completes such projects on the basis of loans, not grants. Since 2000, African countries have been the recipient of over $182 billion in Chinese loans, with interest rates averaging about 3%.

In February 2025, China pledged an additional $4.4 million to de-mining efforts in Cambodia.

Regarding the March 28 Myanmar earthquake, a U.S. State Department spokesperson stated that the United States is working through local partners in Myanmar, and said, "The success in the work and our impact will still be there." However, a former USAID mission head in Myanmar said, "This is the new normal. This is what it looks like when the United States sits on the international sidelines, when the United States is a weaker international player, when it cedes the space to other global players like China." Other potential issues are secondary crisis(es) from diseases such as cholera that can appear in the days and weeks following a disaster.

Michael Sobolik, a China analyst at the conservative Hudson Institute think tank and a former aide to Senator Ted Cruz (R-Texas), has stated, "Sure, USAID was doing some highly questionable stuff that's worthy of review. But don't throw the baby out with the bathwater. Beijing is hoping we do exactly that."

== Estimate of preventable deaths ==
A study published in The Lancet on June 30, 2025, estimated that funding cuts and the abolition of the agency could result in at least 14 million preventable deaths by 2030, 4.5 million of which could be among children under 5 years old, if all spending cuts continue.

=== Impact Counter Dashboard ===
Brooke Nichols, an infectious disease modeler working at Boston University, created an impact counter to estimate the life toll of funding cuts on various USAID health programs. The New Yorker reported that analysis by the Impact Counter attributed an estimated 600,000 deaths to cuts to USAID by November 2025, about two-thirds of them children. By February 2026, the Impact Counter Dashboard was retired, since it had been built to project the impact over the course of one year. The numbers were kept at the one-year mark from when the cuts began: 781,343 deaths caused by the funding discontinuation, of which 518,428 were children. "The impacts we tracked are not over. The consequences of these cuts continue to unfold in communities around the world." (Note: The last numbers archived by the Wayback Machine on February 19, 2026, were 267,238 adults, 555,784 children, 823,022 total deaths, with a rate of 88 deaths per hour. The January 26, 2026, capture, which reports 250,473 adults, 520,920 children, and 771,393 total deaths, is the closest to the numbers as of the retirement date, which is not specified on the current website.)

=== Death toll denial ===
Both Elon Musk and Secretary of State Marco Rubio denied that anyone had died as a result of the USAID budget cuts. Elon Musk said: "No one has died as a result of a brief pause to do a sanity check on foreign aid funding. No one." While testifying before Congress, Marco Rubio rejected references to reported deaths, saying, "That's a lie. False."

== Reactions ==
=== Domestic ===
The American Farm Bureau Federation stated, "AID plays a critical role in reducing hunger around the world while sourcing markets for the surplus foods America's farmers and ranchers grow".

== See also ==
- List of development aid agencies
- United States Agency for International Development
- United States foreign aid
- United States military aid
- U.S. International Development Finance Corporation
- Under Secretary of State for Foreign Assistance, Humanitarian Affairs, and Religious Freedom
- Bureau of Disaster and Humanitarian Response
