= Mike Benz =

American political commentator and speechwriter

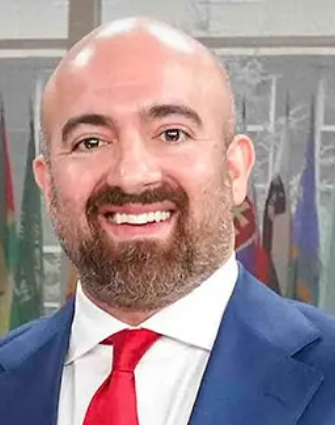
- Occupations: Political commentator, speechwriter
- Organization: Foundation for Freedom Online
- Known for: USAID in the second Trump administration
- Political party: Republican

Mike Benz is an American political commentator, who worked as a speechwriter for Ben Carson and Stephen Miller. He is perhaps best known for his work at the United States Agency for International Development, where he led efforts to dismantle the agency during the second presidency of Donald Trump.

== Career ==
Benz began his career as a corporate lawyer in New York City. In 2018, he was employed at the Department of Housing and Urban Development, and he also worked for two months at the State Department. He later joined Stephen Miller's speechwriting team and was involved in efforts to deny the results of the 2020 presidential election.

Benz alleged that USAID acted as a front for US military and intelligence operations around the world, and he has been credited with Elon Musk's critical focus on the agency. Benz later accepted a position at USAID as a special government employee in order to scrutinize the agency's records.

Media and scholars attributed the decline and demise of USAID to Musk's engagement with claims like Benz's. Other scholars estimated that the agency's closure could lead to more than fourteen million preventable deaths by 2030, more than four million of them among children under five years old.

=== Foundation for Freedom Online ===
In 2022, Benz became the executive director of the Foundation for Freedom Online (FFO), which describes itself as a watchdog organization combatting internet censorship in the United States. According to an early version of FFO's website, it was a project of Empower Oversight, a Republican-linked whistleblower advocacy organization.

Benz released a report on August 27, 2022 alleging that the Department of Homeland Security colluded with technology companies to censor American users. The report was covered by Just the News editor-in-chief John Solomon, who shared the story with Charlie Kirk, and cited by Twitter Files writer Michael Shellenberger.

Benz filed an amicus brief in the Supreme Court case Murthy v. Missouri, repeating allegations that the government created a "complex online censorship regime" to police the speech of American citizens. An initial injunction in that case repeated Benz's allegation that the Election Integrity Partnership flagged 22 million messages to Twitter for removal, although the actual number of messages was less than 3,000. The Supreme Court ultimately ruled 6-3 that the states lacked standing to sue, overturning lower court rulings which Justice Amy Coney Barrett said relied on a "clearly erroneous" reading of the evidentiary record.

== Controversy ==
In 2023, The New York Times and NBC News reported that Benz had published racist content online, under the pseudonym Frame Game. A frequent guest on far-right podcasts, he has described himself as a former member of the Proud Boys and espoused support for the Great Replacement conspiracy theory. Benz, despite being Jewish himself, has also been accused of antisemitism, stating that he believed "Hitler actually had some decent points" in Mein Kampf and that Jews are responsible for global white genocide.
