= Libertarian–authoritarian =

Political spectrum theory

Libertarian–authoritarian is a term used to describe a political spectrum and dimension that spans from libertarianism, which values liberty as primary values; to authoritarianism, a system that rejects political pluralism and civil liberties, which uses strong central power to preserve the political status quo. This spectrum is recognized in the politics of the United Kingdom.

== Overview ==
In the 1990s, the British Journal of Sociology published research studying left–right and libertarian–authoritarian values, describing them as "two core dimensions of mass political belief", and determining that the spectrum has "for several years formed sections of the British Social Attitude Survey". The European Journal of Political Research also studied the dimension within the United Kingdom, regarding its influence in Conservative Party elections from 1979 to 1987. In 2005, in asserting that the British electorate has become more libertarian in recent decades, political scientist, James Tilley, described libertarian-authoritarianism as being "two major value dimensions in British politics". In 2021, after Brexit and regarding the perceived rise of populism, Cornell International Affairs Review published research discussing libertarian-authoritarian as a dichotomy within the Conservative Party. The review theorized the utility of further study to determine whether the dichotomy could be "useful in understanding contemporary or historical political realignments".
