= Special government employee =

United States worker classification

In United States federal law, a special government employee (SGE) is an advisor, expert or consultant who is appointed to work with the federal government. The role of special government employees is defined in Title 18 of the United States Code (U.S.C.) § 202. (Note: 18 U.S.C. § 202 provides: "For the purpose of sections 203, 205, 207, 208, and 209 of this title the term "special Government employee" shall mean an officer or employee of the executive or legislative branch of the United States Government, of any independent agency of the United States or of the District of Columbia, who is retained, designated, appointed, or employed to perform, with or without compensation, for not to exceed one hundred and thirty days during any period of three hundred and sixty-five consecutive days, temporary duties either on a full-time or intermittent basis, a part-time United States commissioner, a part-time United States magistrate judge, or, regardless of the number of days of appointment, an independent counsel appointed under chapter 40 of title 28 and any person appointed by that independent counsel under section 594(c) of title 28. Notwithstanding the next preceding sentence, every person serving as a part-time local representative of a Member of Congress in the Member's home district or State shall be classified as a special Government employee. Notwithstanding section 29(c) and (d) [1] of the Act of August 10, 1956 (70A Stat. 632; 5 U.S.C. 30r(c) and (d)), a Reserve officer of the Armed Forces, or an officer of the National Guard of the United States, unless otherwise an officer or employee of the United States, shall be classified as a special Government employee while on active duty solely for training. A Reserve officer of the Armed Forces or an officer of the National Guard of the United States who is voluntarily serving a period of extended active duty in excess of one hundred and thirty days shall be classified as an officer of the United States within the meaning of section 203 and sections 205 through 209 and 218. A Reserve officer of the Armed Forces or an officer of the National Guard of the United States who is serving involuntarily shall be classified as a special Government employee. The terms "officer or employee" and "special Government employee" as used in sections 203, 205, 207 through 209, and 218, shall not include enlisted members of the Armed Forces.")

== Role ==
Many SGEs have limited roles on federal advisory committees. A 2016 Government Accountability Office found that over the decade from 2005 to 2014, the federal government had an average of roughly 2,000 SGEs in any given year, with a low of about 500 (in 2013) and a high of about 3,100 (in 2009). SGEs have a variety of roles, depending on the agency; for example, Department of Justice SGEs included attorneys with the September 11th Victim Compensation Fund, Department of Health and Human Services SGEs included medical professionals associated with the National Disaster Medical System, and National Science Foundation and Nuclear Regulatory Commission SGEs include scientists and technical experts. In 2013, there were only 50 SGEs that had roles other than as members of federal advisory committees, and 15 of the 50 were unpaid.

== History ==
The SGE category was created by Congress in 1962 and was aimed at allowing the federal government to take advantage of outside experts who are employed in the private sector. The Office of Government Ethics has stated that "SGEs were originally conceived as a 'hybrid' class, in recognition of the fact that the simple categories of 'employee' and 'non-employee' are no longer adequate to describe the multiplicity of ways in which modern government gets its work done." Although the SGE term includes the word "employee", some SGEs are not paid (by the federal government) for the services they provide. SGEs may only be "retained, designated, appointed, or employed" by the government for "not more than 130 days" during any consecutive 365-day period.

== Ethics ==
SGEs are subject to some federal ethics rules, but are exempt from others. SGEs are exempt from Federal Acquisition Regulation 3.601, which states that a contracting officer may not knowingly award a contract to a government employee or to an organization owned or substantially owned by one or more government employees. If a contract were to arise directly out of the special government employee's advisory services, or the appointment could be influenced by the special government employee, or another conflict of interest were to affect the appointment, then the prohibition would still apply.

SGEs are subject to financial reporting requirements. An SGE who is expected to work more than 60 days in a year and is paid at least 120% of the minimum for a GS-15 must file similar reports as a regular employee. SGEs who do not meet both the 60 day and pay requirements must file confidential financial disclosures unless their position entails only a remote possibility of a conflict of interest or is low enough to make reporting unnecessary.

== Notable examples ==
Notable examples of SGEs include Huma Abedin (who was an SGE in the State Department in 2012, working for Secretary of State Hillary Clinton), Scott Atlas (an advisor appointed by President Donald Trump to the White House Coronavirus Task Force in 2020), and Elon Musk (appointed by Donald Trump as de facto leader of the Department of Government Efficiency in 2025).

== See also ==
- Excepted service
- Government employees in the United States
- United States federal civil service
