= Vivian Wilson =

American model and activist (born 2004)

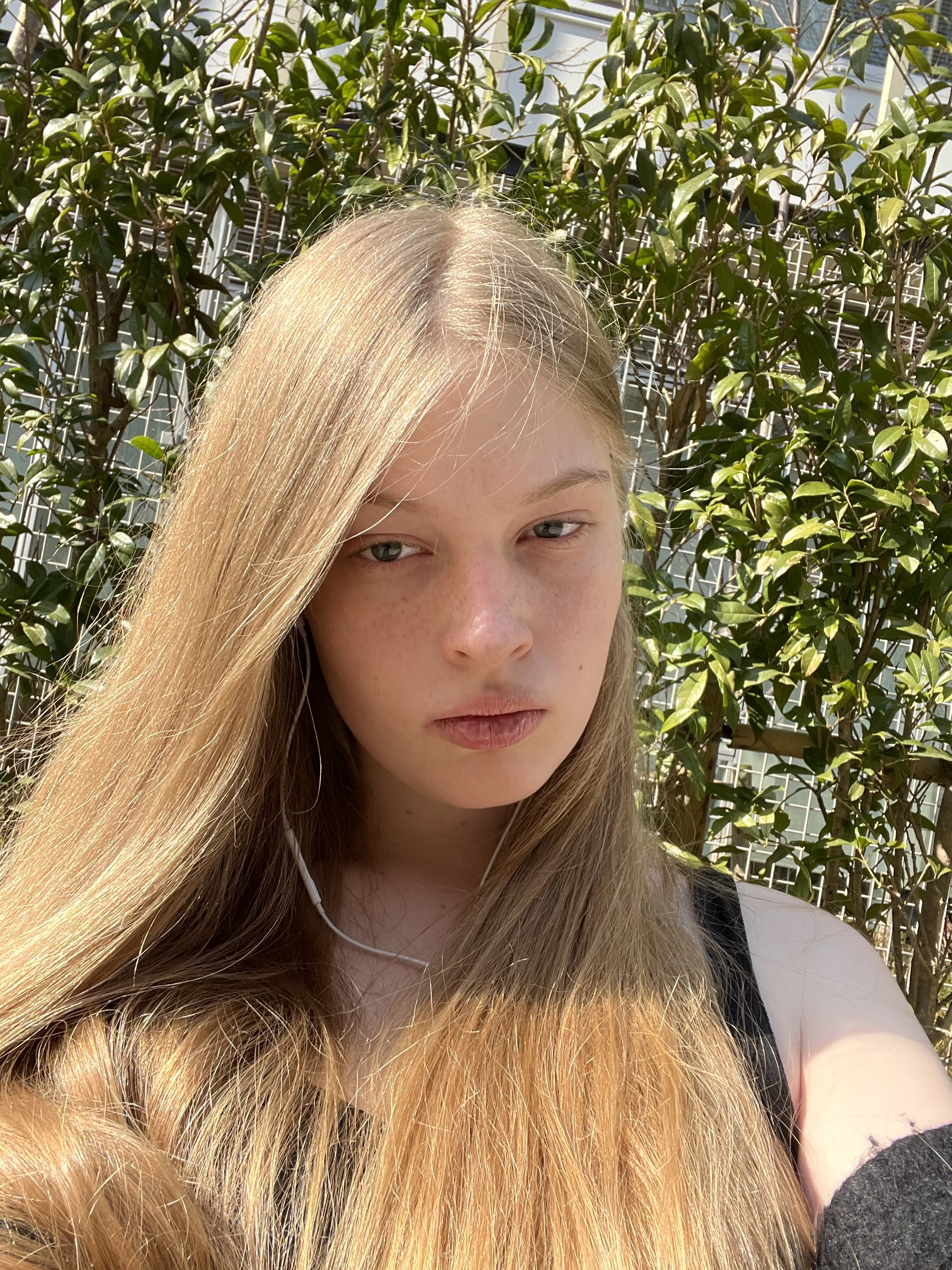
- Wilson in 2025
- Born: April 17, 2004 (age 22); Los Angeles, California, U.S.
- Citizenship: United States; Canada
- Parents: Elon Musk (father); Justine Musk (mother)
- Family: Musk

Instagram information
- Page: vivllainous
- Followers: 1.5 million

TikTok information
- Page: vivllainous
- Followers: 2.2 million
- Last updated: November 12, 2026

Vivian Jenna Wilson (born April 17, 2004) is an American model, activist and social media personality. She is the eldest daughter of Elon Musk and his first wife, Justine Musk (née Wilson). In 2020, Wilson came out as a transgender woman, began treatment for gender dysphoria, and became estranged from Elon Musk, changing her legal name two years later. In March 2025, she featured on the cover of Teen Vogue. Later that year, she signed with the talent agency CAA, having returned to Los Angeles for modelling after dropping out from Temple University in Japan.

Wilson is politically outspoken. She identifies as a leftist and supports universal basic income, health care, reducing wealth inequality, and human rights. Wilson has been critical of Elon Musk's actions and views on transgender rights, as well as her portrayal in his biography by Walter Isaacson. Musk has blamed his estranged relationship with Wilson on "neo-Marxist" influences, a characterization that Wilson rejects.

== Early life and gender identity ==
Vivian Jenna Wilson was born on April 17, 2004, in Los Angeles, California, to South African businessman Elon Musk and his first wife, Canadian author Justine Wilson. Through her mother, Wilson is a Canadian citizen. She was conceived through in vitro fertilization (IVF); her father reportedly used sex-selective IVF to ensure she would be a boy.

Wilson stated that her father was often absent, "cold", "quick to anger", "uncaring", and "narcissistic". She also said he often harassed her for displaying "femininity and queerness". Musk separately shared anecdotes of her as a child, stating that Wilson was "born gay and slightly autistic" and used to "pick out clothes for me to wear like a jacket and tell me it was 'fabulous!'" Wilson rejects her father's anecdotes, describing them as an untrue attempt to characterize her as a camp gay man. Wilson's parents divorced in 2008, and agreed to share custody of her and her siblings. She attended the Crossroads School in Santa Monica.

=== Coming out ===
Wilson came out as transgender via a publicly posted Instagram story in 2020. In an interview with Teen Vogue in 2025, she expressed regret for not telling her mother first. Reportedly, her mother was very supportive of her transition and was not surprised when Wilson came out. Her father was not as supportive, and according to Wilson, she had not spoken to him in months, but required his permission for her to begin testosterone blockers and hormone replacement therapy. Wilson began her treatment for gender dysphoria in 2020, which she states her father did not initially support. However, she was already distancing herself from him at this time.

In June 2022, at the age of 18, a California judge approved her request to change her legal name (taking her mother's maiden name), as well as gender on her birth certificate, after she applied in the Los Angeles County Superior Court. In her petition, Wilson stated that she no longer wished to be related to Musk "in any way, shape, or form". Wilson has also stated she is bisexual.

== Public image ==
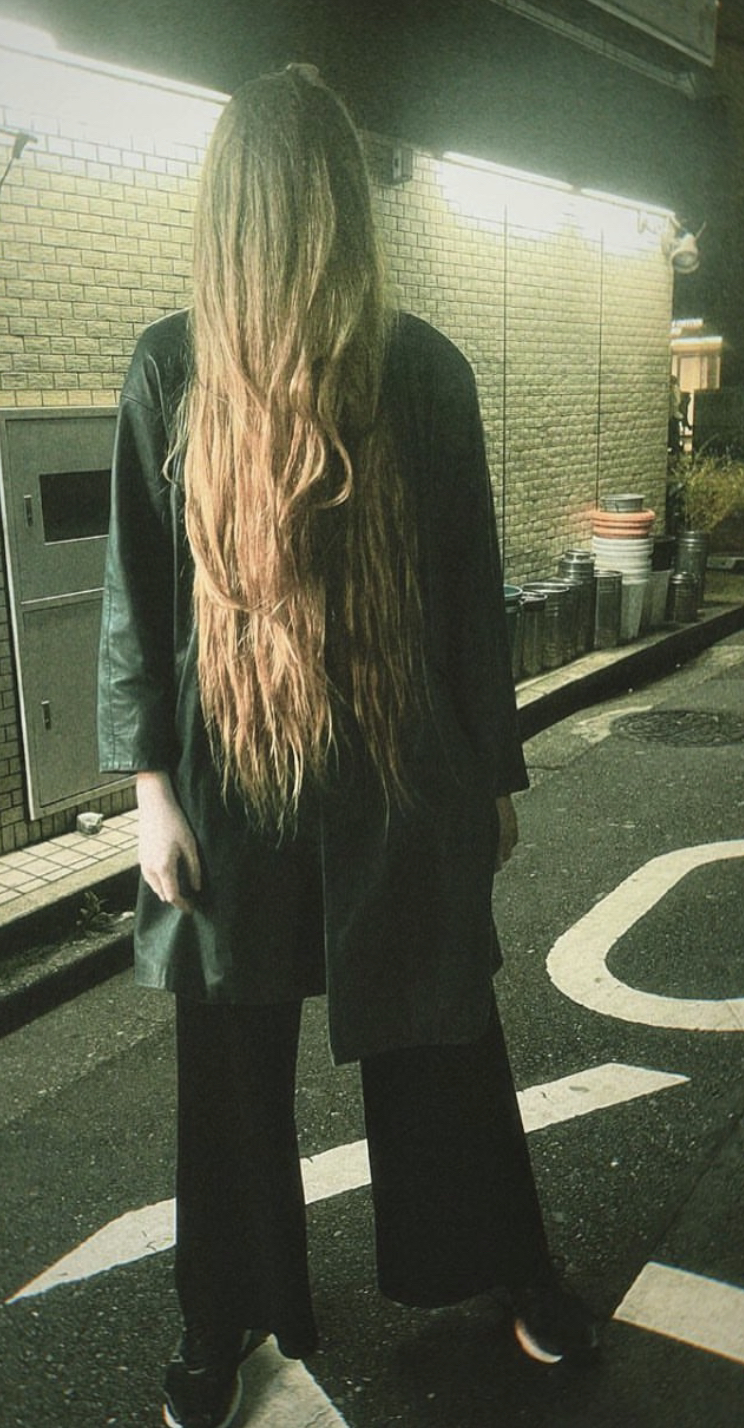
Wilson is known for her "extremely online" personality.

In 2025, Wilson was featured on the cover of Teen Vogue. Teen Vogue described Wilson as "extremely online" and "really good at it"; she is outspoken about transgender issues, which she has noted she feels "obligated to talk about", and has described the state of American politics in 2025 as "terrifying". Wilson has spoken at length about her political views, describing herself as a leftist while rejecting characterization as a Marxist. She has expressed support for universal basic income and health care, reducing wealth inequality, and food, water, and shelter as human rights. When asked if her upbringing influenced her politics, she said "Seeing that kind of wealth – extravagant wealth – firsthand, while living in Los Angeles and seeing the [huge] homelessness problem, the wealth gap ... You start to wonder, how is this fair?"

Wilson has been critical of Musk's actions and views on transgender rights. Following the result of the 2024 United States presidential election, Wilson said she intended to emigrate from the United States in the future. After Musk's salute controversy at Donald Trump's inauguration, she said "let's call a spade a fucking spade". In September 2025, Wilson made her New York Fashion Week debut as a runway model. In 2026, she created a line of merchandise featuring the phrase "evil woke mind virus", referencing past comments by Musk, with a portion of the profits being donated to the Trevor Project, an LGBTQ youth charity.

== Personal life ==
After a semester at college in Quebec, Wilson transferred to the Temple University campus in Tokyo, Japan, to study Japanese. She dropped out after a year and a half and returned to Los Angeles in spring 2025, and by September 2025 she had an agent at CAA. Prior to her public prominence, Wilson had hoped to work as a translator, and had been studying French, Spanish, and Japanese to that end. Since then she has considered other possibilities, including Twitch streaming. She and her mother are on good terms. Wilson has four full siblings: a twin brother, Griffin, and three younger brothers who are triplets, named Kai, Saxon, and Damian, and at least nine half-siblings from her father's side.

=== Criticism of Walter Isaacson's Musk biography ===
Wilson has criticized the biography Elon Musk by Walter Isaacson as inaccurate and unfair to her. Her portrayal has been described as that of "an angry, rebellious child, blinded by radical anti-capitalist ideology and hurting her father with her rash decisions". The book also calls her by her middle name, Jenna, and describes her politics as "radical Marxism", quoting Musk's sister-in-law Christiana Musk. Wilson said Isaacson never contacted her directly before publication; Isaacson said he had reached out to her through family members. Wilson called the book "genuinely defamatory", saying Isaacson deliberately failed to get her side of the story and treated her as a "villain backstory-origin" to explain away her father's behavior. Wilson alleged that "[Isaacson] had an agenda when writing his book, which was to make Elon look good, or look more complex than he is. In order to do that, he needed to villainize the trans teenager and make it seem like there were two reasonable sides to the story".

=== Relationship with father ===
Wilson has described her father as "a pathetic man-child", and has been financially independent from him since she first came out as transgender in 2020. In October 2022, Musk blamed his estranged relationship with Wilson on "neo-Marxist" influences due to the unspecified "elite university" she attended. In a July 2024 interview conducted by Jordan Peterson, Musk spoke negatively of Wilson's transition and deadnamed her. He said he was "tricked" into granting her request for gender-affirming treatment, as California law required both parents' permission since Wilson was under 18 at the time. Musk ultimately described her as having been "killed by the woke mind virus" in conjunction with her transition.

Musk has said that Wilson's gender transition sparked his drive to "destroy the woke mind virus". Isaacson's biography of Musk argued that his shift towards more right-wing politics was "partly triggered by [Wilson]'s transition, her embrace of radical socialist politics, and her decision to break off relations with him". Wilson disputes this account and has described it as "a convenient narrative". Grimes, Musk's former partner, publicly backed Wilson after her July 2024 comments, writing that she was "forever endlessly proud" of her.

== See also ==
- List of Teen Vogue cover models
- List of transgender people
