= Justine Musk =

Canadian author (born 1972)

- Born: Jennifer J. Wilson; September 2, 1972 (age 54); Peterborough, Ontario, Canada
- Occupation: Author
- Spouse: Elon Musk (m. 2000; div. 2008)
- Children: 6, including Vivian (Note: One child is deceased from SIDS.)
- Writing career
- Notable work: BloodAngel

Jennifer Justine Musk (née Wilson; born September 2, 1972) is a Canadian author. She is the first ex-wife of Elon Musk and the mother of Vivian Wilson.

== Early life ==
Jennifer Musk was born Jennifer J. Wilson on September 2, 1972, in Peterborough, Ontario, to parents Terry and Shirley Wilson. She was the oldest of two children. Her younger sister, Erin, eventually left Peterborough to live in Los Angeles with Justine. Musk spent her senior year of high school in Wagga Wagga, Australia, as an exchange student. She went on to attend Queen's University in Kingston, Ontario, and obtained a degree in English literature. There she met Elon Musk.

== Career ==
After university, Musk moved to Japan, teaching English as a second language (ESL). She subsequently settled in California.

Musk is the author of the contemporary fantasy novel BloodAngel, published in 2005 by the Roc Books imprint of Penguin Books. Her second book, Uninvited, was released in 2007 and is an unrelated work intended for young-adult readers. A sequel to BloodAngel, Lord of Bones, was released in 2008. Musk was one of the first people to use a site like Pinterest to plan out a novel.

In a 2007 interview, she identified Margaret Atwood, Joyce Carol Oates, Paul Theroux, George R. R. Martin, Guy Gavriel Kay, and Neil Gaiman as authors to whom she could relate her writings. She also described her books as cross-genre fiction.

== Personal life ==
Following a protracted courtship starting in or about 1992, the marriage of Justine and Elon Musk took place in January 2000. Their first child was born in 2002 and died of sudden infant death syndrome (SIDS) at the age of 10 weeks. Through in vitro fertilization, she gave birth to twins in 2004 and triplet boys in 2006. On September 13, 2008, she announced that she and Elon were getting a divorce. She and Elon shared custody of their children.

Justine Musk later wrote an article for Marie Claire detailing ways she thought the marriage was unhealthy, such as Elon's dismissal of her career ambitions and his description of himself as the "alpha" in the relationship. In 2010, she described herself as a "model former wife", and said she was on good terms with Elon's then-wife, Talulah Riley.

She has said that she kept the last name Musk for their children's sake. In 2022, one of their twins formally changed her name to Vivian Jenna to reflect her gender identity and took Wilson as her surname because she no longer wished to be associated with her father.

== Bibliography ==
Year	Title	Publisher	ISBN	Notes
2005	BloodAngel	Roc imprint, Penguin Books	ISBN 9780451460523	
2007	Uninvited	Paw Prints	ISBN 9781435223806	
2008	Lord of Bones	Roc imprint, Penguin Books	ISBN 9780451462206	Sequel to BloodAngel
2009	"I need more you", in The Mammoth Book of Vampire Romance 2	Running Press	ISBN 9780762437962	Short story in a collection of short stories
2010	"Lost", in Kiss Me Deadly : 13 Tales of Paranormal Love	Running Press	ISBN 9780762439492	Short story in a collection of short stories
2016	"Smalltown Canadian girl", in The House that Made Me: Writers Reflect on the Places and People that Defined Them	Sparkpress	ISBN 9781940716312	Short story in a collection of short stories
