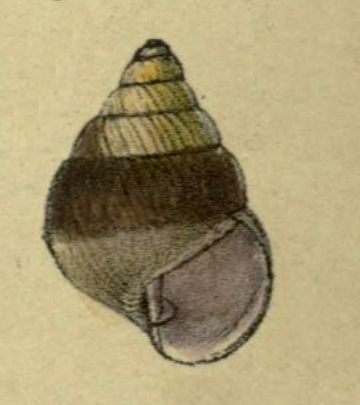
- Shell of Amastra irwiniana (holotype)

Scientific classification
- Kingdom: Animalia
- Phylum: Mollusca
- Class: Gastropoda
- Order: Stylommatophora
- Family: Amastridae
- Genus: Amastra
- Species: A. irwiniana

Binomial name
- Amastra irwiniana C. M. Cooke, 1908

Synonyms
- Amastra (Metamastra) irwiniana E. A. C. M. Cooke, 1908 alternative representation

= Amastra irwiniana =

Species of mollusc

Amastra irwiniana is a species of air-breathing land snail, a terrestrial pulmonate gastropod mollusc in the family Amastridae.

== Description ==
The length of the shell attains 11.2 mm, its diameter 7.2 mm.

The shell is minutely but distinctly perforate, dextral, and globosely conical with slightly concave outlines. It is thin, with distinctly irregular and closely spaced growth striae, and lacks gloss. The upper whorls and the base of the body whorl are light brown with a faint yellowish tinge, while the upper portion of the body whorl is dark chestnut.

The spire is slightly concavely conical with an acute apex. The suture is simple and well impressed. There are 6½ whorls, with the embryonic ones slightly swollen, the fourth and fifth slightly flatter, and the body whorl being convex and tumid, featuring an almost obsolete angle at the periphery and tapering toward the base.

The aperture is relatively large, bluish on the interior, and shaped like a slightly oblique sector of a circle. The columella is straight, bearing a nearly median, rather large, thin, and slightly oblique fold. The outer lip is thin, slightly thickened within, erect, and regularly curved, forming a distinct angle with the base of the columella. The columellar margin is thin and reflexed above the umbilicus. The umbilicus itself is minute and semicircular.

== Distribution ==
This species is endemic to Hawaii, occurring on Oahu island.
