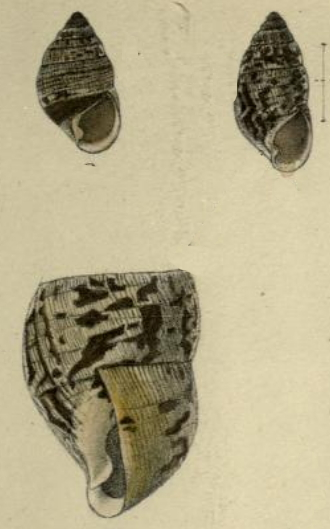
- Shell of Amastra transversalis

Scientific classification
- Kingdom: Animalia
- Phylum: Mollusca
- Class: Gastropoda
- Order: Stylommatophora
- Family: Amastridae
- Genus: Amastra
- Species: A. transversalis

Binomial name
- Amastra transversalis (L. Pfeiffer, 1856)

Synonyms
- Achatinella (Laminella) transversalis L. Pfeiffer, 1856 alternative representation; Amastra (Amastra) transversalis (L. Pfeiffer, 1856) alternative representation

= Amastra transversalis =

Species of mollusc

Amastra transversalis is a species of air-breathing land snail, a terrestrial pulmonate gastropod mollusc in the family Amastridae.

Subspecies

- Amastra transversalis bryani Pilsbry & C. M. Cooke, 1914
- Amastra transversalis transversalis (L. Pfeiffer, 1856)

== Description ==
The length of the shell attains 12 mm, its diameter 6 mm

The shell is subrimate, ovate-conic, and solid, with closely spaced striations that are faintly decussated by distant, spiral, impressed lines. Its coloration is blackish-red, covered by a tawny-gray epidermis that is interrupted by spots and bands, adding a pattern of visual interest.

The spire is inflated-conic and terminates in an acute apex. The shell consists of 6 whorls, which are slightly convex, with the body whorl making up about two-fifths of the total shell length.

The aperture is slightly oblique and sinuate-oval. The columellar fold is lamelliform, subbasal, and nearly transverse. The peristome is unexpanded, whitish on the interior or delicately edged with a rose tint, enhancing the shell's elegance.

The embryonic whorls are dark red-brown, densely and finely striated vertically. After the first whorl, these striations are crossed by very fine spiral lines, giving a delicate decussate pattern. The body whorl is marked by irregular vertical striae, intersected by incised spiral lines. These spirals vary greatly, ranging from deep, strong, and numerous to faint and sparse, with some shells displaying only trace vestiges that are difficult to discern.

The shell's ground color is a rich dark red-brown, partially obscured by intricate whitish tracery that forms a wonderfully varied pattern. On rare occasions, the ground color is a much lighter shade of brown, causing the creamy markings to appear faint. The interior is typically dark flesh-colored, featuring a wide, moderately thick border along the inner lip. The shell's axis is either rimate or imperforate.

== Distribution ==
This species is endemic to Hawaii, occurring on Oahu island.
