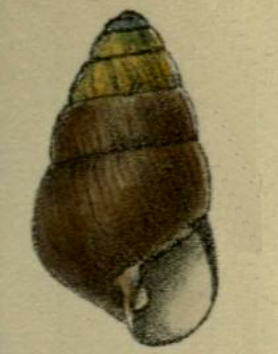
- Shell of Amastra davisiana (holotype)

Scientific classification
- Kingdom: Animalia
- Phylum: Mollusca
- Class: Gastropoda
- Order: Stylommatophora
- Family: Amastridae
- Genus: Amastra
- Species: A. davisiana

Binomial name
- Amastra davisiana C. M. Cooke, 1908

Synonyms
- Amastra (Metamastra) davisiana E. A. C. M. Cooke, 1908 alternative representation

= Amastra davisiana =

Species of mollusc

Amastra davisiana is a species of air-breathing land snail, a terrestrial pulmonate gastropod mollusc in the family Amastridae.

== Description ==
The length of the shell attains 16.5 mm, its diameter 9.2 mm.

The shell is perforate, dextral, and subconic, with slightly convex outlines. It is faintly and obtusely angular at the periphery and has a somewhat flattened base. The shell is rather solid, nearly smooth, and distinctly striated just below the sutures with almost regular lines. It exhibits a subtle gloss and is dark reddish-brown, featuring an indistinct broad dark band located just above the periphery, which continues onto the spire near the sutures.

The spire is nearly conical, with a very obtuse apex. The suture is minutely crenulate, barely impressed, and marked by a yellowish edge. The shell comprises 6½ whorls, with the embryonic whorls being relatively large for the genus. The remaining whorls increase slowly and evenly in size and are almost flat. The body whorl descends slightly near the aperture.

The aperture is small, subquadrate, and oblique, with a bluish interior. The inner margin of the columella is slightly diagonal, while the outer lip is nearly straight. The columellar fold is robust, thick, nearly basal, and slightly oblique. The outer margin of the lip is thin, slightly thickened internally, nearly straight above, and curved below, forming a slight angle where it meets the base of the columella. The columellar margin is thin and reflexed above the umbilicus, which is small and semicircular.

"I am not aware of any species closely related to this one. It is entirely distinct from all other known species of Amastra. The blunt apex, coupled with its very regular coiling and nearly flat whorls, makes it remarkably unique."

== Distribution ==
This species is endemic to Hawaii, occurring on Oahu island.
