= Amastra pilsbryi =

Scientific classification
- Kingdom: Animalia
- Phylum: Mollusca
- Class: Gastropoda
- Order: Stylommatophora
- Family: Amastridae
- Genus: Amastra
- Species: A. pilsbryi

Binomial name
- Amastra pilsbryi C. M. Cooke, 1917

Synonyms
- Amastra (Heteramastra) pilsbryi C. M. Cooke, 1913 alternative representation

Species of gastropod

Amastra pilsbryi is a species of air-breathing land snail, a terrestrial pulmonate gastropod mollusc in the family Amastridae.

== Description ==
The length of the shell attains 13.4 mm, its diameter 8.1 mm.

(Original description) The shell is imperforate, sinistral, and elliptical with a conic spire that tapers near the summit. One co-type displays an old-gold color streaked with chestnut behind the outer lip, with the spire exhibiting a brownish hue. The other (a dead specimen) is wax yellow in front of the aperture, featuring a pale tawny cuticle with a yellow gleam, and the last third of the body whorl shaded in chestnut.

The surface of the body whorl is semi-matte, while the spire is more lustrous. To the naked eye, the shell appears smooth, but under magnification, uneven growth-wrinkles are visible. The approximately 2½ whorls of the protoconch are carinate, with the keel evident above the suture. The initial half whorl is nearly smooth, followed by two whorls adorned with regular, slightly arcuate ribs that are relatively coarse at first, becoming finer toward the completion of the embryonic stage.

The shell consists of 5½ whorls in total. They are convex, with the body whorl being distinctly swollen below the deeply impressed suture, ventricosely rounded, and tapering toward the base. The aperture is somewhat elongated, narrow, and slightly oblique, with a smooth white interior. The peristome is subtly thickened near its edge. The columellar lamella is of moderate size, thin, spirally curved, and white, while the parietal callus is thin and delicate.

== Distribution ==
This species is endemic to Hawaii, occurring on Maui Island.
