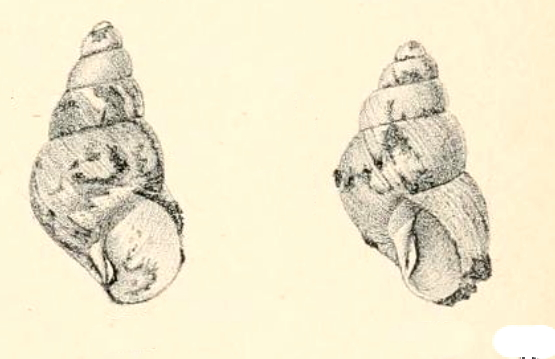
- Shell of Amastra fragilis (holotype)

Scientific classification
- Kingdom: Animalia
- Phylum: Mollusca
- Class: Gastropoda
- Order: Stylommatophora
- Family: Amastridae
- Genus: Amastra
- Species: A. fragilis

Binomial name
- Amastra fragilis Pilsbry & C. M. Cooke, 1914

Synonyms
- Amastra (Cyclamastra) fragilis Pilsbry & C. M. Cooke, 1914 · alternative representation

= Amastra fragilis =

Species of mollusc

Amastra fragilis is a species of air-breathing land snail, a terrestrial pulmonate gastropod mollusc in the family Amastridae.

== Description ==
The length of the shell attains 9 mm, its diameter 4.7 mm.

(Original description) The thin shell is fragile, and perforate, with a narrowly ovate-conic shape. Its chestnut-brown surface is dull, barely shining, and finely irregularly striated, with occasional larger striae occurring at irregular intervals. It is often soiled with fecal matter and dirt. The summit is somewhat obtuse, and the whorls are convex, with the body whorl being obtusely angular around the narrow umbilical slit. The aperture is oval and angular at both ends, with a thin, fragile outer lip. The columellar lip is also thin and straightened, while the columellar lamella is small, thin, and very oblique, not quite extending to the edge.

== Distribution ==
This species is endemic to Hawaii and occurs on Molokai Island.
