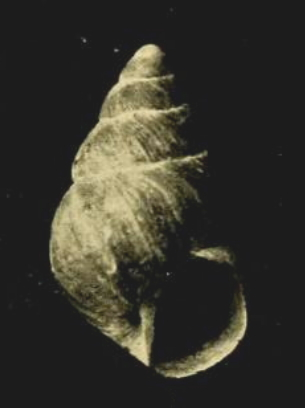
- Shell of Amastra modicella (holotype)

Scientific classification
- Kingdom: Animalia
- Phylum: Mollusca
- Class: Gastropoda
- Order: Stylommatophora
- Family: Amastridae
- Genus: Amastra
- Species: A. modicella

Binomial name
- Amastra modicella C. M. Cooke, 1917

Synonyms
- Amastra (Cyclamastra) modicella C. M. Cooke, 1917 alternative representation

= Amastra modicella =

Species of gastropod

Amastra modicella is a species of air-breathing land snail, a terrestrial pulmonate gastropod mollusc in the family Amastridae.

== Description ==
The length of the shell attains 11 mm, its diameter 5.6 mm.

(Original description) The shell is openly perforate, dextral, thin, and fragile, with a pale brownish-white appearance in its fossilized state. The whorls of the protoconch are minutely but distinctly striated and convex. Subsequent whorls are also convex, sharply and irregularly sculptured with growth wrinkles that become progressively coarser with each successive whorl. The sutures are relatively deep.

The aperture is relatively large and broad for a shell of this size, featuring a prominently convex outer margin. Unlike most species in this genus, the outer margin is not distinctly biangular. The columella is narrowly triangular with a straight outer margin. The columellar fold is very weak, diagonal, and extends nearly to the base of the columella.

The umbilicus is minute, nearly circular, and bordered by a rounded edge.

== Distribution ==
This species is endemic to Hawai.
