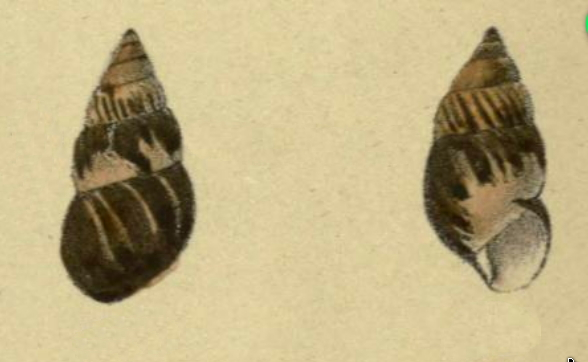
- Shell of Amastra uniplicata

Scientific classification
- Domain: Eukaryota
- Kingdom: Animalia
- Phylum: Mollusca
- Class: Gastropoda
- Order: Stylommatophora
- Family: Amastridae
- Genus: Amastra
- Species: A. uniplicata

Binomial name
- Amastra uniplicata (W. D. Hartman, 1888)

Synonyms
- Achatinella (Amastra) uniplicata W. D. Hartman, 1888 superseded combination; Amastra (Amastra) uniplicata W. D. Hartman, 1888 alternative representation

= Amastra uniplicata =

Species of gastropod

Amastra uniplicata is a species of air-breathing land snail, a terrestrial pulmonate gastropod mollusc in the family Amastridae.

Subspecies

- Amastra uniplicata uniplicata (W. D. Hartman, 1888)
- Amastra uniplicata vetuscula C. M. Cooke, 1917

== Description ==
The length of the shell can reach 20 mm, its diameter 9 mm

The shell is dextral, solid, and elongated oval, occasionally exhibiting a cylindrical form. It consists of seven slightly rounded whorls, with the body whorl being somewhat inflated. The suture is distinctly impressed, and the surface is marked by fine, longitudinal striations.

The aperture is sub-oval and white, featuring a single, elongated, twisted columellar plica within. The outer lip is thin and acute. The shell's underlying color is a pale ochre-yellow, concealed beneath a dark, black epidermis, which lends it a striking contrast.

== Distribution ==
This species is endemic to Hawai, occurring on Molokai Island.
