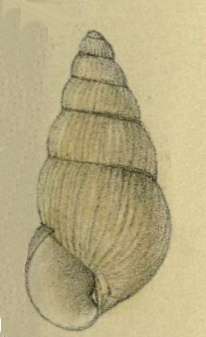
- Shell of Amastra perversa (holotype)

Scientific classification
- Kingdom: Animalia
- Phylum: Mollusca
- Class: Gastropoda
- Order: Stylommatophora
- Family: Amastridae
- Genus: Amastra
- Species: A. perversa

Binomial name
- Amastra perversa Hyatt & Pilsbry, 1911

Synonyms
- Amastra (Heteramastra) perversa Hyatt & Pilsbry, 1911 alternative representation

= Amastra perversa =

Species of mollusc

Amastra perversa is a species of air-breathing land snail, a terrestrial pulmonate gastropod mollusc in the family Amastridae.

== Description ==
The length of the shell attains 11.5 mm, its diameter 5.5 mm.

(Original description) The shell contains 6½ whorls. The shell is sinistral, oblong-turrite, and relatively solid. The spire tapers slightly near the summit, giving it a subtle contracted appearance.

The whorls of the protoconch are delicately ribbed, resembling those of Astrama laeva, while the subsequent whorls display faint and subdued growth wrinkles, which are less pronounced than in A. laeva.

The aperture is small and somewhat thickened on the interior, providing structural reinforcement. The columellar lamella is small, oblique, and receding, contributing to the shell's refined and understated design.

== Distribution ==
This species is endemic to Hawaii, occurring on Molokai Island.
