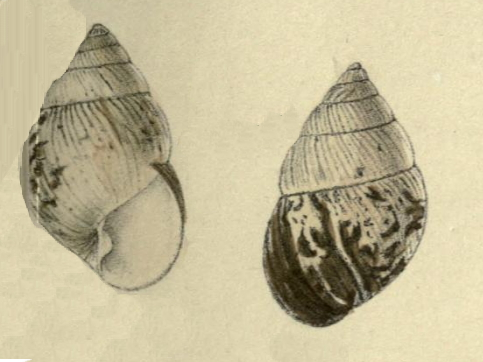
- Shell of Amastra malleata (holotype)

Scientific classification
- Domain: Eukaryota
- Kingdom: Animalia
- Phylum: Mollusca
- Class: Gastropoda
- Order: Stylommatophora
- Family: Amastridae
- Genus: Amastra
- Species: A. malleata

Binomial name
- Amastra malleata E. A. Smith, 1873

Synonyms
- Amastra (Amastra) malleata E. A. Smith, 1873 alternative representation

= Amastra malleata =

Species of mollusc

Amastra malleata is a species of air-breathing land snail, a terrestrial pulmonate gastropod mollusc in the family Amastridae.

== Description ==
The length of the shell attains 14 mm, its diameter 8 mm.

The shell is acutely ovate and dextral, delicately striated with growth lines and attractively malleated. Its surface is a dirty whitish hue, adorned with a variable brownish-olivaceous epidermis. There are six slightly convex whorls, with the first three prominently marked by strong radial sulcations. The suture is simple and well-defined.

The aperture is white, with a thin peristome that is subtly thickened on the interior. The columellar fold is slender and understated.

== Distribution ==
This species is endemic to Hawaii, occurring on Maui island.
