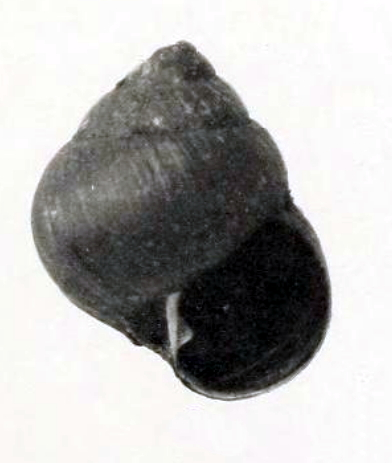
- Shell of Amastra praeopima (holotype)

Scientific classification
- Kingdom: Animalia
- Phylum: Mollusca
- Class: Gastropoda
- Order: Stylommatophora
- Family: Amastridae
- Genus: Amastra
- Species: A. praeopima

Binomial name
- Amastra praeopima C. M. Cooke, 1917

Synonyms
- Amastra (Metamastra) praeopima C. M. Cooke, 1917 alternative representation

= Amastra praeopima =

Species of gastropod

Amastra praeopima is a species of air-breathing land snail, a terrestrial pulmonate gastropod mollusc in the family Amastridae.

== Description ==
The length of the shell attains 9.2 mm, its diameter 5.4 mm.

(Original description) The shell is perforate, dextral, globose, very thin, and transparent, with a uniform dull Brussels-brown coloration and no deciduous cuticle. The spire is short, obliquely triangular, with slightly convex outlines.

The whorls of the protoconch are convex, with the first being smooth and increasing rapidly in size. Subsequent whorls increase more gradually and are minutely sculptured with fine transverse growth-wrinkles. The whorls are convex and separated by a very shallow suture.

The body whorl is large, rotund, and prominent. The aperture is oblique and broad, with a very convex outer margin accented by a delicate lip-rib. The columella is narrowly triangular, slightly oblique, and features a concave inner margin and an erect, straight outer margin.

The columellar fold is strong, nearly transverse, and terminates abruptly near the base of the columella, close to the outer margin. The umbilicus is distinctly open and cleft-like, adding to the shell's delicate structure.

== Distribution ==
This species is endemic to Hawai, occurring on Oahu Island.
