= Amastra flemingi =

Scientific classification
- Kingdom: Animalia
- Phylum: Mollusca
- Class: Gastropoda
- Order: Stylommatophora
- Family: Amastridae
- Genus: Amastra
- Species: †A. flemingi

Binomial name
- †Amastra flemingi C. M. Cooke, 1917

Synonyms
- Amastra (Heteramastra) flemingi C. M. Cooke, 1917 alternative representation

Species of gastropod

Amastra flemingi is an extinct species of air-breathing land snail, a terrestrial pulmonate gastropod mollusc in the family Amastridae.

== Description ==
The length of the shell attains 13.7 mm, its diameter 6 mm.

(Original description) The shell is indistinctly rimate, sinistral, and oblong-turrited, appearing whitish in its fossilized state. The spire is elongated and subtly contracted near the apex, with slightly convex outlines.

The whorls of the protoconch are finely and regularly striated, while the subsequent whorls are smoother, with faint, distinct growth wrinkles. From the penultimate to the neanic whorls, the whorls are slightly obliquely angled above the oblique sutures. The body whorl is elongate, subcylindrical, and tapers gradually towards the base, lacking any trace of a supraperipheral angle.

The aperture is narrow and distinctly biangular, with the outer margin regularly curved and strengthened by a pronounced lip rib. The columella is straight, with its outer margin closely appressed to the shell except at the base. The columellar fold is relatively strong, subbasal in position, and subtransverse, gradually tapering near the margin of the columella.

== Distribution ==
This species was endemic to Hawai, occurring in Pleistocene strata on Maui Island.
