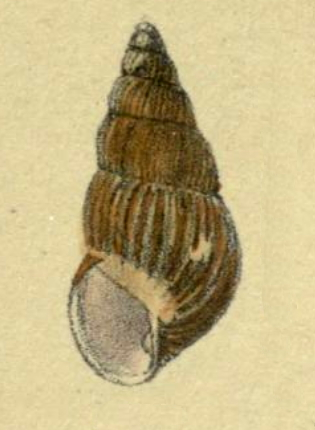
- Shell of Amastra hutchinsonii

Scientific classification
- Kingdom: Animalia
- Phylum: Mollusca
- Class: Gastropoda
- Order: Stylommatophora
- Family: Amastridae
- Genus: Amastra
- Species: A. hutchinsonii

Binomial name
- Amastra hutchinsonii (Pease, 1862)

Synonyms
- Amastra (Heteramastra) hutchinsonii (Pease, 1862) alternative representation; Amastra villosa Sykes, 1896 junior subjective synonym; Helicter hutchinsonii Pease, 1862 superseded combination; Heteramastra hutchinsonii (Pease, 1862) superseded combination

= Amastra hutchinsonii =

Species of mollusc

Amastra hutchinsonii is a species of air-breathing land snail, a terrestrial pulmonate gastropod mollusc in the family Amastridae.

== Description ==
The length of the shell attains 24.5 mm, its diameter 7.3 mm

The shell is acuminately turrited, sinistral, and imperforate. It consists of 7 whorls that are flatly convex, coarsely and irregularly striated longitudinally, without any marginations. The sutures are somewhat rough but well-impressed. The aperture is ovate, approximately two-fifths the length of the shell. The columellar fold is slight, oblique, and tortuous. The shell is covered with an earthy brown epidermis, with the apex being darker in color. The aperture and columella are white and shining.

In Mauian specimens, the shell is typically rimate, rarely imperforate as previously described by W.H. Pease. The embryonic whorls are exquisitely costellate, with the riblets following the usual curved pattern. The later whorls display a coarse sculpture of uneven wrinkles. These whorls are covered with a thin, rusty or chestnut cuticle, under which a light yellow under-layer is exposed by wear on the wrinkles, often covered with blackish dirt. Beneath the cuticle, the shell itself is white. The columellar lamella is small and strongly oblique.

== Distribution ==
This species is endemic to Hawaii, occurring on Maui island.
