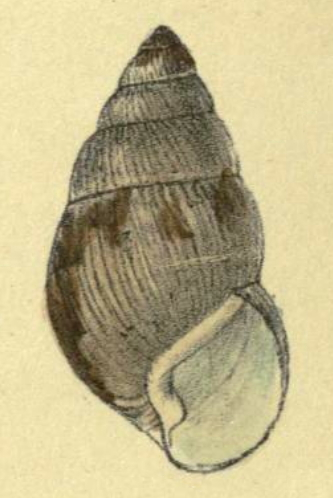
- Shell of Amastra subobscura (holotype)

Scientific classification
- Kingdom: Animalia
- Phylum: Mollusca
- Class: Gastropoda
- Order: Stylommatophora
- Family: Amastridae
- Genus: Amastra
- Species: A. subobscura

Binomial name
- Amastra subobscura Hyatt & Pilsbry, 1911

Synonyms
- Amastra (Amastra) subobscura Hyatt & Pilsbry, 1911 alternative representation

= Amastra subobscura =

Species of mollusc

Amastra subobscura is a species of air-breathing land snail, a terrestrial pulmonate gastropod mollusc in the family Amastridae.

Subspecies

- Amastra subobscura puella Pilsbry & C. M. Cooke, 1914
- Amastra subobscura subobscura Hyatt & Pilsbry, 1911

== Description ==
The length of the shell attains 11.9 mm, its diameter 6 mm.

(Original description) The shell contains 6 whorls. The shell is minutely perforate, oblong-conic, and relatively thin with a slight sheen. The spire's outlines are nearly straight. The whorls of the protoconch are reddish-brown, with a smooth initial half-whorl followed by a coarsely costate whorl that is carinated just above the suture. The subsequent whorl is finely and densely costulate, with a subtle angularity near the lower suture.

The later whorls are convex, adorned with growth wrinkles and subplicate ridges just below the suture. They are pale fleshy-gray, partially covered by a very thin, smooth olivaceous cuticle, which is darkest on the latter half of the body whorl and absent near the aperture.

The aperture is pinkish-white, with the outer lip remaining unthickened. The parietal callus is whitish and moderately thick.

== Distribution ==
This species is endemic to Hawaii, occurring on Molokai Island.
