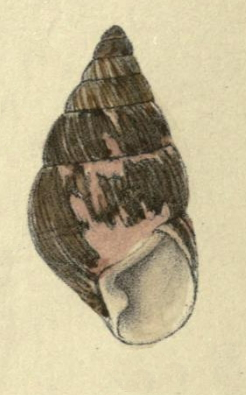
- Shell of Amastra aemulator (holotype)

Scientific classification
- Kingdom: Animalia
- Phylum: Mollusca
- Class: Gastropoda
- Order: Stylommatophora
- Family: Amastridae
- Genus: Amastra
- Species: A. aemulator

Binomial name
- Amastra aemulator Hyatt & Pilsbry, 1911

Synonyms
- Amastra (Metamastra) aemulator Hyatt & Pilsbry, 1911 alternative representation

= Amastra aemulator =

Species of mollusc

Amastra aemulator is a species of air-breathing land snail, a terrestrial pulmonate gastropod mollusc in the family Amastridae.

== Description ==
The length of the shell attains 15.5 mm, its diameter 8.6 mm.

(Original description) The shell contains seven whorls. The shell is narrowly perforate, ovate-pyramidal, and moderately solid. The spire's outlines are nearly straight at the base, becoming slightly concave near the apex. The whorls are slightly convex and relatively short. The 2½ whorls of the protoconch are a dull purplish color and very finely and regularly striate when unworn. The subsequent whorls are irregularly wrinkle-striate, with the cuticle initially light olive, transitioning to olive-brown on the last two whorls. The surface is somewhat glossy, but where the cuticle is worn away, it reveals a dull gray and purplish-brown calcareous layer beneath.

The aperture is small, slightly oblique, and dull purplish-gray inside, becoming paler with a barely perceptible thickening near the lip. The columella is short, thick, and whitish, featuring a subhorizontal lamella. The parietal callus is very thick, its edge forming a ledge that seamlessly connects the ends of the lip.

== Distribution ==
This species is endemic to Hawaii and occurs on Oahu Island.
