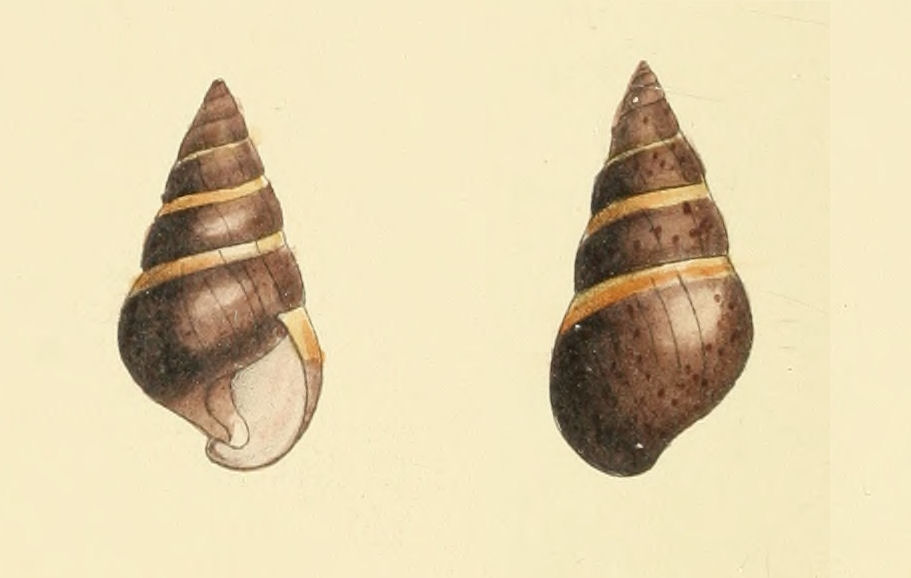
- Amastra elongata shell

Scientific classification
- Kingdom: Animalia
- Phylum: Mollusca
- Class: Gastropoda
- Order: Stylommatophora
- Superfamily: Pupilloidea
- Family: Amastridae
- Subfamily: Amastrinae
- Genus: Amastra; H. Adams & A. Adams, 1855

Type species
- Achatinella magna C. B. Adams, 1851

Synonyms
- Achatinella (Amastra) H. Adams & A. Adams, 1855 superseded rank; Achatinella (Carinella) L. Pfeiffer, 1875 (invalid: junior homonym of Carinella Johnston, 1833 [Nemertea]; Kauaia is a replacement name); Amastra (Amastra) H. Adams & A. Adams, 1855· accepted, alternate representation; Amastra (Amastrella) Sykes, 1900· accepted, alternate representation; Amastra (Armiella) Hyatt, 1911· accepted, alternate representation; Amastra (Cyclamastra) Pilsbry & Vanatta, 1905· accepted, alternate representation; Amastra (Heteramastra) Pilsbry, 1911· accepted, alternate representation; Amastra (Kauaia) Sykes, 1900· accepted, alternate representation; Amastra (Metamastra) Hyatt & Pilsbry, 1911· accepted, alternate representation; Amastra (Paramastra) Hyatt & Pilsbry, 1911· accepted, alternate representation; Amastrella Sykes, 1900; Armiella Hyatt, 1911 · unaccepted > superseded rank; Cyclamastra Pilsbry & Vanatta, 1905; Helicter (Amastra) H. Adams & A. Adams, 1855 superseded rank; Heteramastra Pilsbry, 1911; Kauaia Sykes, 1900 (unaccepted rank); Metamastra Hyatt & Pilsbry, 1911 superseded rank; Paramastra Hyatt & Pilsbry, 1911 ·

= Amastra =

Genus of gastropods

Amastra is a genus of small air-breathing land snails, terrestrial pulmonate gastropod mollusks in the family Amastridae.

Like many Hawaiian land snails, species in this genus have adapted to a specific ecological niche and have evolved in relative isolation. They used to thrive in wet or moderately wet forested areas.

Unfortunately, many of the species in this genus have become extinct in recent times or have become critically endangered through habitat loss or, in most cases, predation by Euglandina rosea. This loss is often highlighted as part of the broader biodiversity crisis faced by the Hawaiian Islands.

Some individuals of remaining extant Amastra species were collected for captive breeding programs at the Bishop Museum and Snail Extinction Prevention Program. Reintroductions of some species are currently underway.

== Description ==
The elongated shell is typically dextral (but some are sinistral), ranging from globose-conic to oblong-conic in shape. It may be umbilicate or imperforate. he shell surface might show growth striations or a fine malleation. The coloration varies, often appearing dull or dark, but sometimes light with a dull, darker, or yellowish cuticle. The shell consists of 5½ to 8 whorls, with the spire and apex conical in shape. The aperture is ovate, and the outer lip is not expanded but is often thickened internally. The columella features a spiral lamella that penetrates about half a whorl, and is present at all stages of growth observed. Above the lamella, the axis is slightly sinuous.

The species is viviparous. The jaw is vertically striate, and the teeth are arranged in nearly straight transverse rows, exhibiting the typical quadrate form. The central teeth are narrow with small, sinuous cusps.

== Distribution ==
This genus is endemic to the Hawaiian Islands.

== Species ==
Species within the genus Amastra include:

- † Amastra abavus Hyatt & Pilsbry, 1911
- †Amastra aemulator Hyatt & Pilsbry, 1911
- †Amastra affinis (Newcomb, 1854)
- †Amastra agglutinans (Newcomb, 1854)
- †Amastra albocincta (Pilsbry & C. M. Cooke, 1914)
- †Amastra albolabris (Newcomb, 1854)
- †Amastra anthonii W. Newcomb, 1861
- †Amastra antiqua (Baldwin, 1895)
- †Amastra assimilis (Newcomb, 1854)
- †Amastra aurostoma Baldwin, 1896
- †Amastra badia (Baldwin, 1895)
- †Amastra baldwiniana Hyatt & Pilsbry, 1911
- †Amastra biplicata (Newcomb, 1854)
- †Amastra borcherdingi Hyatt & Pilsbry, 1911
- †Amastra breviata (Baldwin, 1895)
- †Amastra caputadamantis Hyatt & Pilsbry, 1911
- †Amastra conica Baldwin, 1906
- †Amastra conifera E. A. Smith, 1873
- † Amastra cornea (Newcomb, 1854)
- † Amastra crassilabrum (Newcomb, 1854)
- †Amastra cyclostoma (Baldwin, 1895)
- Amastra cylindrica (Newcomb, 1854)
- †Amastra davisiana C. M. Cooke, 1908
- †Amastra decorticata Gulick, 1873
- †Amastra delicata C. M. Cooke, 1933
- †Amastra durandi Ancey, 1897
- †Amastra dwightii C. M. Cooke, 1933
- †Amastra elegantula Hyatt & Pilsbry, 1911
- †Amastra elephantina C. M. Cooke, 1917
- †Amastra elliptica Gulick, 1873
- † Amastra elongata (Newcomb, 1853)
- †Amastra eos (Pilsbry & C. M. Cooke, 1914)
- †Amastra extincta (L. Pfeiffer, 1856)
- †Amastra flavescens (Newcomb, 1854)
- † Amastra flemingi C. M. Cooke, 1917 †
- † Amastra forbesi C. M. Cooke, 1917
- †Amastra fossilis Baldwin, 1903
- †Amastra fragilis (Pilsbry & C. M. Cooke, 1914)
- †Amastra fragosa C. M. Cooke, 1917
- †Amastra fraterna Sykes, 1896
- † Amastra globosa C. M. Cooke, 1933
- Amastra goniops (Pilsbry & C. M. Cooke, 1914)
- †Amastra gouveii C. M. Cooke, 1917
- †Amastra grayana (L. Pfeiffer, 1856)
- †Amastra gulickiana A. Hyatt & H.A. Pilsbry, 1911
- †Amastra hawaiiensis Hyatt & Pilsbry, 1911
- †Amastra hitchcocki C. M. Cooke, 1917
- †Amastra humilis (Newcomb, 1855)
- †Amastra hutchinsonii (Pease, 1862)
- †Amastra implicata C. M. Cooke, 1933
- †Amastra inflata (L. Pfeiffer, 1856)
- †Amastra inopinata C. M. Cooke, 1933
- †Amastra irwiniana C. M. Cooke, 1908
- †Amastra johnsoni Hyatt & Pilsbry, 1911
- †Amastra juddii C. M. Cooke, 1917
- †Amastra kalamaulensis (Pilsbry & C. M. Cooke, 1914)
- †Amastra kauaiensis (Newcomb, 1860)
- †Amastra kaunakakaiensis (Pilsbry & C. M. Cooke, 1914)
- †Amastra knudsenii (Baldwin, 1895)
- †Amastra laeva Baldwin, 1906
- Amastra lahainana (Pilsbry & C. M. Cooke, 1914)
- †Amastra luctuosa (L. Pfeiffer, 1856)
- †Amastra luteola (A. Férussac, 1825)
- †Amastra magna (C. B. Adams, 1851)
- †Amastra makawaoensis Hyatt & Pilsbry, 1911
- †Amastra malleata E. A. Smith, 1873
- †Amastra mastersi (Newcomb, 1854)
- †Amastra melanosis (Newcomb, 1854)
- †Amastra metamorpha (Pilsbry & C. M. Cooke, 1914)
- Amastra micans (L. Pfeiffer, 1859)
- †Amastra mirabilis C. M. Cooke, 1917
- †Amastra modesta (C. B. Adams, 1851)
- †Amastra modicella C. M. Cooke, 1917
- †Amastra moesta (Newcomb, 1854)
- †Amastra montagui Pilsbry, 1913
- Amastra montana Baldwin, 1906
- †Amastra montivaga C. M. Cooke, 1917
- †Amastra morticina Hyatt & Pilsbry, 1911
- †Amastra mucronata (Newcomb, 1853)
- †Amastra nana (Baldwin, 1895)
- †Amastra nannodes C. M. Cooke, 1933
- †Amastra neglecta (Pilsbry & C. M. Cooke, 1914)
- †Amastra nigra (Newcomb, 1855)
- †Amastra nubifera Hyatt & Pilsbry, 1911
- †Amastra nubigena (Pilsbry & C. M. Cooke, 1914)
- †Amastra nubilosa (Mighels, 1845)
- †Amastra nucleola (Gould, 1845)
- †Amastra nucula E. A. Smith, 1873
- †Amastra obesa (Newcomb, 1853)
- †Amastra oswaldi C. M. Cooke, 1933
- † Amastra ovatula C. M. Cooke, 1933
- †Amastra pagodula C. M. Cooke, 1917
- †Amastra paulula C. M. Cooke, 1917
- † Amastra pellucida (Baldwin, 1895)
- †Amastra perversa Hyatt & Pilsbry, 1911
- †Amastra petricola (Newcomb, 1855)
- †Amastra pilsbryi C. M. Cooke, 1913
- † Amastra porcusHyatt & Pilsbry, 1911
- †Amastra porphyrostoma (Pease, 1869)
- †Amastra praeopima C. M. Cooke, 1917
- †Amastra problematica C. M. Cooke, 1933
- †Amastra pullata (Baldwin, 1895)
- †Amastra pusilla (Newcomb, 1855)
- † Amastra reticulata (Newcomb, 1854)
- †Amastra ricei C. M. Cooke, 1917
- Amastra rubens (Gould, 1845)
- †Amastra rubida Gulick, 1873
- †Amastra rubristoma Baldwin, 1906
- †Amastra rugulosa Pease, 1870
- †Amastra seminigra Hyatt & Pilsbry, 1911
- †Amastra senilis Baldwin, 1903
- †Amastra sericea (L. Pfeiffer, 1859)
- †Amastra similaris Pease, 1870
- †Amastra sinistrorsa Baldwin, 1906
- †Amastra sola Hyatt & Pilsbry, 1911
- †Amastra soror (Newcomb, 1854)
- †Amastra spaldingi C. M. Cooke, 1908
- †Amastra sphaerica Pease, 1870
- †Amastra spicula C. M. Cooke, 1917
- Amastra spirizona (Quoy & Gaimard, 1825)
- †Amastra subcornea Hyatt & Pilsbry, 1911
- †Amastra subcrassilabris Hyatt & Pilsbry, 1911
- †Amastra subobscura Hyatt & Pilsbry, 1911
- † Amastra subrostrata (L. Pfeiffer, 1859)
- † Amastra subsoror Hyatt & Pilsbry, 1911
- †Amastra sykesi Hyatt & Pilsbry, 1911
- †Amastra tenuilabris Gulick, 1873
- † Amastra tenuispira (Baldwin, 1895)
- †Amastra textilis (Quoy & Gaimard, 1825)
- †Amastra thaamuni Hyatt & Pilsbry, 1911
- †Amastra thurstoni C. M. Cooke, 1917
- †Amastra transversalis (L. Pfeiffer, 1856)
- †Amastra tricincta Hyatt & Pilsbry, 1911
- Amastra tristis (Quoy & Gaimard, 1825)
- Amastra turritella (A. Férussac, 1821)
- †Amastra ultima (Pilsbry & C. M. Cooke, 1914)
- † Amastra umbilicata (L. Pfeiffer, 1856)
- †Amastra undata (Baldwin, 1895)
- †Amastra uniplicata (W. D. Hartman, 1888)
- Amastra variegata (L. Pfeiffer 1849)
- †Amastra vetusta (Baldwin, 1895)
- †Amastra violacea (Newcomb, 1853)
- †Amastra viriosa C. M. Cooke, 1917
- †Amastra whitei C. M. Cooke, 1917

== Taxa inquirenda ==
- Amastra amboinensis E. A. Smith, 1873
- Amastra amicta E. A. Smith, 1873
- Amastra citrea Sykes, 1896: synonym of Amastra mucronata citrea Sykes, 1896 (superseded rank)
- Amastra lineolata (Newcomb, 1853)
- Amastra longa Sykes, 1896
- Amastra peasei E. A. Smith, 1873
- Amastra seminuda Baldwin, 1906
- Amastra villosa Sykes, 1896: synonym of Amastra hutchinsonii (Pease, 1862) (junior subjective synonym)

== Synonyms ==
- Amastra acuta (Swainson, 1828): synonym of Amastra spirizona (Quoy & Gaimard, 1825) (junior subjective synonym)
- Amastra anaglypta C. M. Cooke, 1917: synonym of Amastra sericea anaglypta C. M. Cooke, 1917 (superseded rank)
- Amastra bigener Hyatt, 1911: synonym of Amastra affinis (Newcomb, 1854) (junior subjective synonym)
- Amastra carinata Gulick, 1873: synonym of Amastra agglutinans (Newcomb, 1854) (junior subjective synonym)
- Amastra citrea Sykes, 1896: synonym of Amastra mucronata citrea Sykes, 1896 (superseded rank)
- Amastra conicospira E. A. Smith, 1873: synonym of Amastra cylindrica (Newcomb, 1854) (junior subjective synonym)
- Amastra cookei Hyatt & Pilsbry, 1911: synonym of Amastra textilis (Quoy & Gaimard, 1825) (junior subjective synonym)
- Amastra deshaysii (Morelet, 1857): synonym of Amastra assimilis (Newcomb, 1854) (junior subjective synonym)
- Amastra frosti Ancey, 1892: synonym of Amastra micans (L. Pfeiffer, 1859) (junior subjective synonym)
- Amastra heliciformis Ancey, 1890: synonym of Tropidoptera heliciformis (Ancey, 1890) (superseded combination)
- Amastra henshawi Baldwin, 1903: synonym of Amastra flavescens henshawi Baldwin, 1903 (superseded rank)
- Amastra kuhnsi Cooke, 1908: synonym of Laminella kuhnsi (C. M. Cooke, 1908) (original combination)
- Amastra nigrolabris E. A. Smith, 1873: synonym of Amastra spirizona nigrolabris E. A. Smith, 1873 (superseded rank)
- Amastra rustica Gulick, 1873: synonym of Amastra affinis (Newcomb, 1854) (junior subjective synonym)
- Amastra saxicola Baldwin, 1903: synonym of Amastra flavescens saxicola Baldwin, 1903 (superseded combination)
- Amastra simularis W. D. Hartman, 1888: synonym of Amastra mucronata (Newcomb, 1853) (junior subjective synonym)
- Amastra villosa Sykes, 1896: synonym of Amastra hutchinsonii (Pease, 1862) (junior subjective synonym
