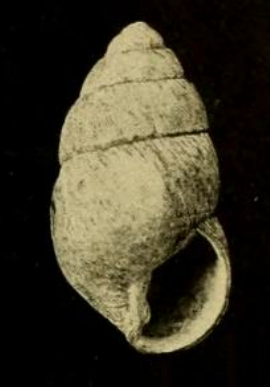
- Shell of Amastra elephantina (holotype)

Scientific classification
- Kingdom: Animalia
- Phylum: Mollusca
- Class: Gastropoda
- Order: Stylommatophora
- Family: Amastridae
- Genus: Amastra
- Species: A. elephantina

Binomial name
- Amastra elephantina C. M. Cooke, 1917

Synonyms
- Amastra (Cyclamastra) elephantina C. M. Cooke, 1917 alternative representation

= Amastra elephantina =

Species of gastropod

Amastra elephantina is a species of air-breathing land snail, a terrestrial pulmonate gastropod mollusc in the family Amastridae.

== Description ==
The length of the shell attains 24.4 mm, its diameter 15.3 mm.

(Original description) The shell is openly perforate, globosely conical, and relatively thin for its size. In its fossil state, the shell is white, with the entire margin of the aperture exhibiting a pinkish hue. The whorls of the protoconch are slightly convex and nearly smooth, appearing somewhat darker than the rest of the shell.

Subsequent whorls are convex, with the penultimate and final whorls displaying distinctly spaced but somewhat irregular striae. Between these coarser striae, there are numerous (6–10) finer striae. The body whorl is particularly large and tapers toward the base. It contracts along the margin of the umbilicus, forming a blunt, rounded keel.

The aperture is relatively small and slightly contracted, lined with a thick, heavy, pinkish callus along its outer lip. The columella is very broad, featuring a low, thick, and slightly oblique fold near its base. The parietal margin is covered with a thick layer of pinkish callus, adding to the shell's distinctive appearance.

== Distribution ==
This species is endemic to Hawai, occurring on Oahu Island.
