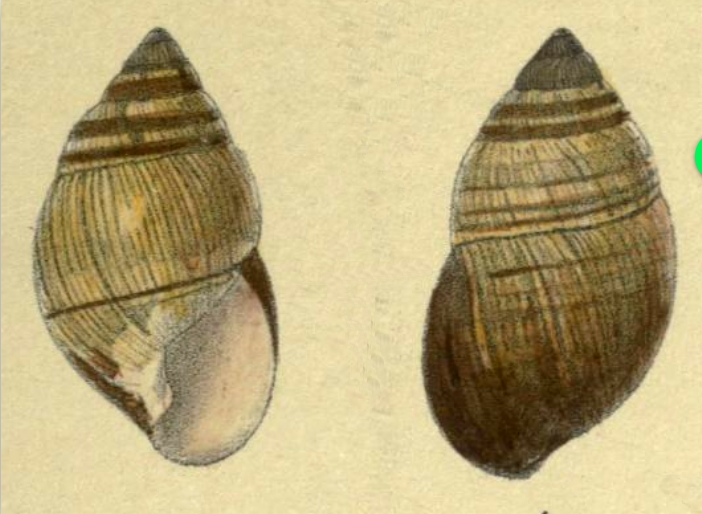
- Shell of Amastra grayana

Scientific classification
- Kingdom: Animalia
- Phylum: Mollusca
- Class: Gastropoda
- Order: Stylommatophora
- Family: Amastridae
- Genus: Amastra
- Species: A. grayana

Binomial name
- Amastra grayana (L. Pfeiffer, 1856)

Synonyms
- Achatinella (Laminella) grayana L. Pfeiffer, 1856 alternative representation; Amastra (Amastra) grayana (L. Pfeiffer, 1856) alternative representation

= Amastra grayana =

Species of mollusc

Amastra grayana is a species of air-breathing land snail, a terrestrial pulmonate gastropod mollusc in the family Amastridae.

== Description ==
The length of the shell attains 21.5 mm, its diameter 12 mm

The shell is imperforate, dextral, ovate-conic, and rather solid, with a slightly glossy surface. It is grayish-flesh colored and irregularly marked with chestnut bands that fade near the upper portion. The spire is inflated-conic with an acute, black apex. The shell contains 6½ whorls; the upper ones are flat and radially plicate, the penultimate whorl is convex, and the body whorl, which is nearly as long as the spire, is finely striate.

The aperture is subvertical and acuminate-oval. The columellar fold is median, subtransverse, and triangular. The peristome is simple and unexpanded, with the columellar margin slightly dilated and adnate.

== Distribution ==
This species is endemic to Hawaii, occurring on Oahu island.

It has been originally recorded from Oahu, evidently in error, since no Oahuan species has flat, radially plicate upper whorls.
