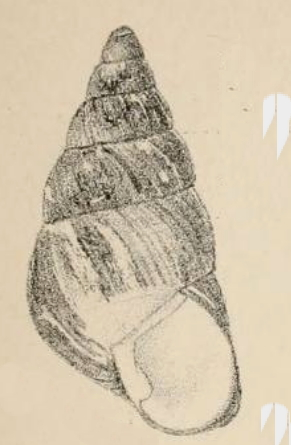
- Shell of Amastra metamorpha (holotype)

Scientific classification
- Kingdom: Animalia
- Phylum: Mollusca
- Class: Gastropoda
- Order: Stylommatophora
- Family: Amastridae
- Genus: Amastra
- Species: A. metamorpha

Binomial name
- Amastra metamorpha Pilsbry & C. M. Cooke, 1914

Synonyms
- Amastra (Cyclamastra) metamorpha Pilsbry & C. M. Cooke, 1914 · alternative representation

= Amastra metamorpha =

Species of mollusc

Amastra metamorpha is a species of air-breathing land snail, a terrestrial pulmonate gastropod mollusc in the family Amastridae.

Subspecies

- Amastra metamorpha debilis Pilsbry & C. M. Cooke, 1914
- Amastra metamorpha metamorpha Pilsbry & C. M. Cooke, 1914

== Description ==
The length of the shell attains 12.25 mm, its diameter 6.3 mm.

(Original description) The shell is perforate, dextral, and long-conic in shape, with a relatively thin structure. It is russet in color, with the body whorl typically exhibiting a light brownish-olive or Isabella hue, and appearing white beneath the cuticle in mature specimens. The spire is straightly conic, with convex whorls throughout.

The embryonic whorls are initially convex and delicately striated, though they become worn in adult shells. The later whorls lack luster and feature a sculpture of faint, irregular growth lines, often accompanied by a few coarse wrinkles on the body whorl.

The aperture is small and lined with a rather thick white layer in adult shells. The outer lip is sharp, edged in dark coloration, and not thickened internally. The columellar lamella is small and oblique, adding to the overall elegance of the shell's structure.

== Distribution ==
This species is endemic to Hawaii and occurs on Maui Island.
