= Amastra mastersi =

Scientific classification
- Kingdom: Animalia
- Phylum: Mollusca
- Class: Gastropoda
- Order: Stylommatophora
- Family: Amastridae
- Genus: Amastra
- Species: A. mastersi

Binomial name
- Amastra mastersi (Newcomb, 1854)

Synonyms
- Achatinella mastersi Newcomb, 1854 superseded combination

Species of gastropod

Amastra mastersi is a species of land snail, a terrestrial pulmonate gastropod mollusc in the family Amastridae.

== Description ==
(Original description) The shell is dextral and thin, consisting of seven rounded whorls, slightly rugose on the upper portion, with the body whorl prominently inflated. The apex is acute, and the suture is well-impressed. The aperture is ovate with a simple outer lip, and the short columella bears a thin lamellar plait.

The shell is either white or a rich chestnut color, often showing traces of a thin brown epidermis. The interior is white or bluish-white.

This species exhibits significant variation in size and coloration, ranging from pure white to shades of light mahogany. The lower part of the shell is often white, while the upper portion may display vibrant hues of chestnut or rose.

== Distribution ==
This marine species is endemic to Hawaii.
