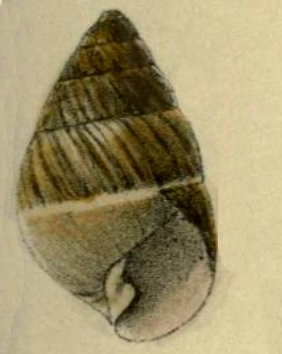
- Shell of Amastra elegantula (holotype)

Scientific classification
- Kingdom: Animalia
- Phylum: Mollusca
- Class: Gastropoda
- Order: Stylommatophora
- Family: Amastridae
- Genus: Amastra
- Species: A. elegantula

Binomial name
- Amastra elegantula Hyatt & Pilsbry, 1911

Synonyms
- Amastra (Amastra) elegantula Hyatt & Pilsbry, 1911 alternative representation

= Amastra elegantula =

Species of mollusc

Amastra elegantula is a species of air-breathing land snail, a terrestrial pulmonate gastropod mollusc in the family Amastridae.

== Description ==
The length of the shell attains 11.8 mm, its diameter 6.9 mm.

(Original description) The shell contains 5½ whorls. The shell is imperforate, small and relatively thin, with an ovate shape and a straightly conic spire. The body whorl is a very pale brown, lighter near the suture, featuring an opaque white band at the periphery and sparsely streaked with brown, transitioning to chestnut-brown behind the lip.

The whorls in the protoconch are slightly convex, with the first being very finely striate. The second whorl is finely plicate below the suture and striate in the middle. Subsequent whorls are adorned with growth striae, adding subtle texture to the surface.

The outer lip is thin, while the columella is purplish and supports a relatively strong, thin lamella, contributing to the shell's refined and delicate appearance.

== Distribution ==
This species is endemic to Hawaii and occurs on Molokai Island.
