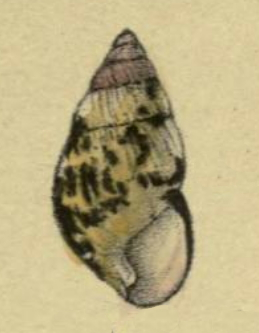
- Shell of Amastra seminigra (holotype)

Scientific classification
- Kingdom: Animalia
- Phylum: Mollusca
- Class: Gastropoda
- Order: Stylommatophora
- Family: Amastridae
- Genus: Amastra
- Species: A. seminigra

Binomial name
- Amastra seminigra Hyatt & Pilsbry, 1911

Synonyms
- Amastra (Amastrella) seminigra Hyatt & Pilsbry, 1911 alternative representation

= Amastra seminigra =

Species of mollusc

Amastra seminigra is a species of air-breathing land snail, a terrestrial pulmonate gastropod mollusc in the family Amastridae.

== Description ==
The length of the shell attains 21.2 mm, its diameter 10.3 mm.

(Original description) The shell contains 6½ whorls. The apical whorls are fleshy or purplish in color, transitioning to a light yellow hue on the last two whorls. These are partially or predominantly covered with a pitch-black cuticle, which may appear in scattered shreds or remain nearly intact, except near the aperture.

The interior of the shell is either white or faintly tinged with pink, adding a subtle contrast to its exterior.

== Distribution ==
This species is endemic to Hawaii, occurring on Oahu Island.

== Sources ==
- Cowie, R. H., Evenhuis, N. L. & Christensen, C. C. (1995). Catalog of the native land and freshwater molluscs of the Hawaiian Islands. vi. Leiden: Backhuys Publishers. p. 107.
