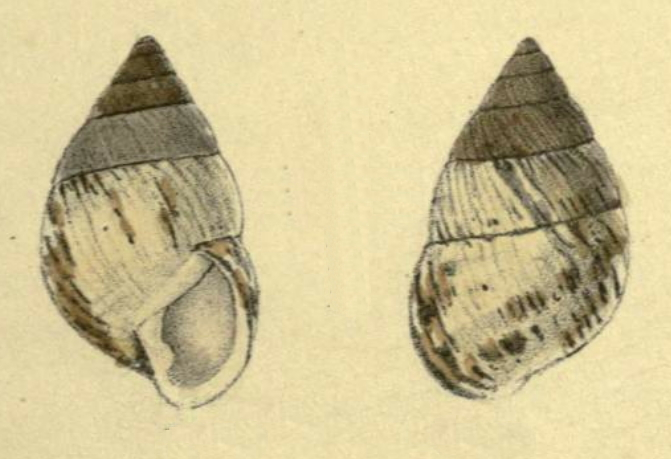
- Shell of Amastra subcrassilabris (holotype)

Scientific classification
- Kingdom: Animalia
- Phylum: Mollusca
- Class: Gastropoda
- Order: Stylommatophora
- Family: Amastridae
- Genus: Amastra
- Species: A. subcrassilabris

Binomial name
- Amastra subcrassilabris Hyatt & Pilsbry, 1911

Synonyms
- Amastra (Amastra) subcrassilabris Hyatt & Pilsbry, 1911 alternative representation

= Amastra subcrassilabris =

Species of mollusc

Amastra subcrassilabris is a species of air-breathing land snail, a terrestrial pulmonate gastropod mollusc in the family Amastridae.

== Description ==
The length of the shell attains 12.5 mm, its diameter 7.4 mm.

(Original description) The shell contains 6¼ whorls. The shell is perforate, acutely ovate, solid and lacks a glossy surface. The spire's outlines are straight or only slightly contracted near the summit, with nearly flat whorls. The whorls of the protoconch are finely striated, while the subsequent whorls are marked by growth wrinkles. The body whorl is spirally maleate below the periphery in the type specimen, though smooth in another example.

The spire is brown, with the penultimate whorl gradually becoming paler. The body whorl is cream-white, occasionally retaining small patches of a thin brown cuticle. The aperture is slightly oblique and white within, with the outer lip thickened by a prominent white rib. The columella is white, straight, and narrowly reflexed, featuring a small white submedian fold.

== Distribution ==
This species is endemic to Hawaii, occurring on Maui Island.
