= Amastra extincta =

Scientific classification
- Kingdom: Animalia
- Phylum: Mollusca
- Class: Gastropoda
- Order: Stylommatophora
- Family: Amastridae
- Genus: Amastra
- Species: A. extincta

Binomial name
- Amastra extincta (L. Pfeiffer, 1856)

Synonyms
- Achatinella (Laminella) extincta L. Pfeiffer, 1856 superseded combination; Amastra (Cyclamastra) extincta (L. Pfeiffer, 1856) alternative representation; Leptachatina hartmani Newcomb, 1888; Leptachatina hartmanii [sic] misspelling - incorrect subsequent spelling

Species of mollusc

Amastra extincta is a species of air-breathing land snail, a terrestrial pulmonate gastropod mollusc in the family Amastridae.

== Description ==
The length of the shell attains 16 mm, its diameter 7.5 mm

The shell is perforate, ovate-turrite, solid, and finely striate, with a chalky texture. The spire is long, tapering upwards, and acute. There are 7 whorls, which are scarcely convex, with the body whorl comprising less than one-third of the total shell length and slightly compressed around the perforation.

The aperture is slightly oblique, rhombic-oval, and angular at the base. The columellar fold is compressed and ascends almost from the base. The peristome is simple and unexpanded, with the margins connected by a thick, somewhat nodular callus. The columellar margin is dilated and free.

== Distribution ==
This species is endemic to Hawaii, occurring on Oahu island.
