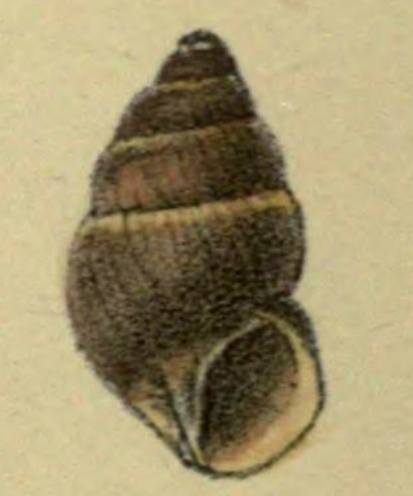
- Shell of Amastra anthonii

Scientific classification
- Kingdom: Animalia
- Phylum: Mollusca
- Class: Gastropoda
- Order: Stylommatophora
- Family: Amastridae
- Genus: Amastra
- Species: A. anthonii

Binomial name
- Amastra anthonii (Newcomb, 1861)

Synonyms
- Achatinella anthonii Newcomb, 1861 superseded combination; Amastra (Amastrella) anthonii (Newcomb, 1861) alternative representation

= Amastra anthonii =

Species of mollusc

Amastra anthonii is a species of air-breathing land snail, a terrestrial pulmonate gastropod mollusc in the family Amastridae.

Subspecies

- Amastra anthonii anthonii (Newcomb, 1861)
- Amastra anthonii meineckei C. M. Cooke, 1933
- Amastra anthonii remota C. M. Cooke, 1917
- Amastra anthonii subglobosa C. M. Cooke, 1933

== Description ==
The length of the shell attains 15 mm, its diameter 10 mm.

(Original description) The shell contains 6 whorls. The shell is conically ovate, solid, and blackish-brown, with longitudinal striations. It comprises six inflated whorls, separated by a moderately impressed suture. The apex is obtuse.

The aperture is obliquely ovate, subtly angulate at the base. The outer lip is simple and thickened on the inner side. The columella is short and straight, bearing a somewhat callous plication below its midpoint.

The shell features a distinct white band below the suture and a dirty white coloration in the umbilical region.

== Distribution ==
This species is endemic to Hawaii, occurring on Kauai Island.
