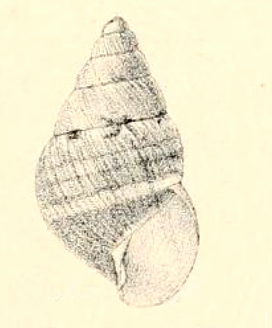
- Shell of Amastra albocincta (holotype)

Scientific classification
- Kingdom: Animalia
- Phylum: Mollusca
- Class: Gastropoda
- Order: Stylommatophora
- Family: Amastridae
- Genus: Amastra
- Species: A. albocincta

Binomial name
- Amastra albocincta Pilsbry & C. M. Cooke, 1914

Synonyms
- Amastra (Amastra) albocincta Pilsbry & C. M. Cooke, 1914 · alternative representation

= Amastra albocincta =

Species of mollusc

Amastra albocincta is a species of air-breathing land snail, a terrestrial pulmonate gastropod mollusc in the family Amastridae.

== Description ==
The length of the shell attains 9.3 mm, its diameter 5 mm.

(Original description) The shell is small, perforate, oblong-conic, and thin. It has a somewhat glossy surface that may appear soiled in life. The spire is straightly conic, tapering to a minute apex. The embryonic whorls are elongated, strongly convex, and adorned with fine striations, giving them a silky luster. The remaining whorls are convex and angular at the periphery, with the angle concealed in adults or occasionally visible just above the suture. The body whorl is rounded, featuring irregular, delicate growth striae. Its coloration is liver-brown, often streaked with yellow and adorned with creamy bands near the suture, periphery, and columella, though these bands are sometimes faint or absent. The aperture is dark within, and the outer lip is thin and not in the least thickened.

== Distribution ==
This species is endemic to Hawaii and occurs on Molokai Island.
