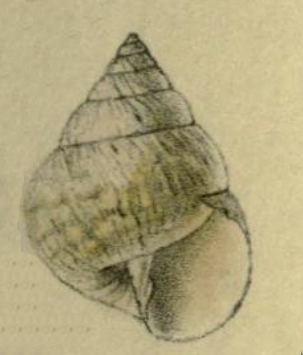
- Shell of Amastra senilis

Scientific classification
- Kingdom: Animalia
- Phylum: Mollusca
- Class: Gastropoda
- Order: Stylommatophora
- Family: Amastridae
- Genus: Amastra
- Species: A. senilis

Binomial name
- Amastra senilis Baldwin, 1903

Synonyms
- Amastra (Amastrella) senilis Baldwin, 1903 alternative representation

= Amastra senilis =

Species of mollusc

Amastra senilis is a species of air-breathing land snail, a terrestrial pulmonate gastropod mollusc in the family Amastridae.

== Description ==
The length of the shell attains 21.2 mm, its diameter 16 mm

The shell is openly umbilicate and broadly conic, with a thin yet delicate structure. The spire is conic, featuring nearly straight outlines and a subacute apex. The shell contains 6¾ whorls. The whorls of the protoconch are finely and sharply striate, closely packed, and well-defined.

The subsequent whorls are moderately convex, prominently marked with rough growth wrinkles. The last three whorls occasionally display small, very shallow spiral striations. The body whorl is carinate at the periphery in front and exhibits coarse malleation, resulting in irregular, spiral, descending ridges interspersed with flattened facets.

The columella is prominently dilated at the upper end, vertically oriented, and adorned with a small fold. The umbilicus is cylindrical, deep, and measures approximately 2 mm in width, adding a notable feature to the shell's structure.

== Distribution ==
This species is endemic to Hawaii, occurring on the Mauna Kea volcano.
