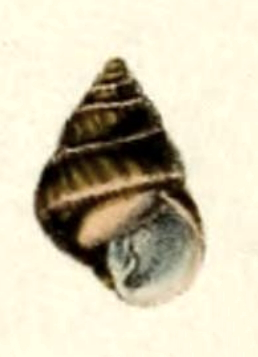
- Shell of Amastra melanosis (holotype)

Scientific classification
- Kingdom: Animalia
- Phylum: Mollusca
- Class: Gastropoda
- Order: Stylommatophora
- Family: Amastridae
- Genus: Amastra
- Species: A. melanosis

Binomial name
- Amastra melanosis (Newcomb, 1854)

Synonyms
- Achatinella melanosis Newcomb, 1854 superseded combination; Amastra (Amastrella) melanosis (Baldwin, 1854) alternative representation

= Amastra melanosis =

Species of gastropod

Amastra melanosis is a species of land snail, a terrestrial pulmonate gastropod mollusc in the family Amastridae.

Subspecies

- Amastra melanosis kauensis Pilsbry & C. M. Cooke, 1915
- Amastra melanosis melanosis (Newcomb, 1854)

== Description ==
(Original description) The shell is dextral, thin, and conically depressed, with an acute apex. It consists of five rounded whorls, with the body whorl noticeably inflated. The suture is well-impressed, and the aperture is subrotund. The outer lip is simple and thin, while the straight white columella ends in a distinctly oblique plait.

The shell is uniformly black in color.

== Distribution ==
This species is endemic to Hawaii.
