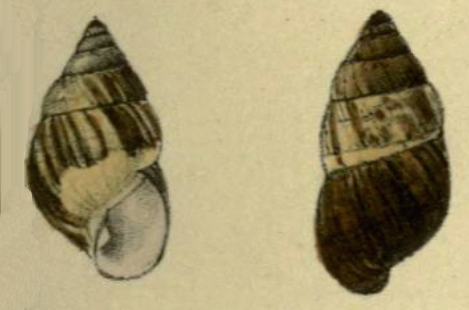
- Shell of Amastra makawaoensis (holotype)

Scientific classification
- Kingdom: Animalia
- Phylum: Mollusca
- Class: Gastropoda
- Order: Stylommatophora
- Family: Amastridae
- Genus: Amastra
- Species: A. makawaoensis

Binomial name
- Amastra makawaoensis Hyatt & Pilsbry, 1911

Synonyms
- Amastra (Amastra) makawaoensis Hyatt & Pilsbry, 1911 alternative representation

= Amastra makawaoensis =

Species of mollusc

Amastra makawaoensis is a species of air-breathing land snail, a terrestrial pulmonate gastropod mollusc in the family Amastridae.

== Description ==
The length of the shell attains 20.5 mm, its diameter 10 mm.

(Original description) The shell contains 6½ whorls. The shell is imperforate and oblong-conic, with spire outlines that are straight in the upper portion and gently convex below. The ground color ranges from very pale ochre or cream to reddish-brown near the apex, transitioning to pale yellow below the periphery.

Except near the aperture, the surface is covered by a dense, somewhat glossy cuticle. On the body whorl, the cuticle is black or occasionally features reddish streaks, while the penultimate whorl is heavily streaked with cream or brownish-white. The earlier whorls are reddish-brown, adorned with pale dots or streaks.

The whorls of the protoconch are flattened, with the first being coarsely costate and bearing a carina that is almost concealed at the suture. The second whorl is more finely ribbed. Subsequent whorls exhibit growth wrinkles, and the last two whorls have numerous shallow, unequal spiral striae, which are often faint or obsolete. The body whorl is not highly convex, typically contracted, and frequently features flattened, spirally descending facets or malleation.

The aperture is white and oblique, with an acute outer lip that is somewhat thickened internally. The columellar fold is moderately thickened at the lower end and ascends very obliquely, adding a refined detail to the shell's overall structure.

== Distribution ==
This species is endemic to Hawaii, occurring on Maui Island.
