= Amastra sericea =

Scientific classification
- Kingdom: Animalia
- Phylum: Mollusca
- Class: Gastropoda
- Order: Stylommatophora
- Family: Amastridae
- Genus: Amastra
- Species: A. sericea

Binomial name
- Amastra sericea (L. Pfeiffer, 1859)

Synonyms
- Achatinella (Laminella) sericea L. Pfeiffer, 1859 superseded combination; Amastra (Metamastra) sericea (L. Pfeiffer, 1859) alternative representation

Species of mollusc

Amastra sericea is a species of air-breathing land snail, a terrestrial pulmonate gastropod mollusc in the family Amastridae.

Subspecies

- Amastra sericea anaglypta C. M. Cooke, 1917
- Amastra sericea sericea (L. Pfeiffer, 1859)

== Description ==
The length of the shell attains 17 mm, its diameter 9.3 mm

The shell is imperforate, dextral, ovate-conic, and solid, with a surface characterized by coarse striation and minute granulate decussation from spiral striae, giving it a silky texture. Its coloration is deep brown, with a spire that is convexly conic and rather acute.

The shell comprises nearly six convex whorls, paler at the sutures. The body whorl constitutes two-fifths of the total length and is whitish around the columella. The columella features a short, compressed, and oblique lamina.

The aperture is oblique and elliptical. The peristome is simple and unexpanded, with the right margin forming a nearly semicircular curve and connecting angularly to the calloused columella.

== Distribution ==
This rare species is endemic to Hawaii, occurring on Oahu island.
