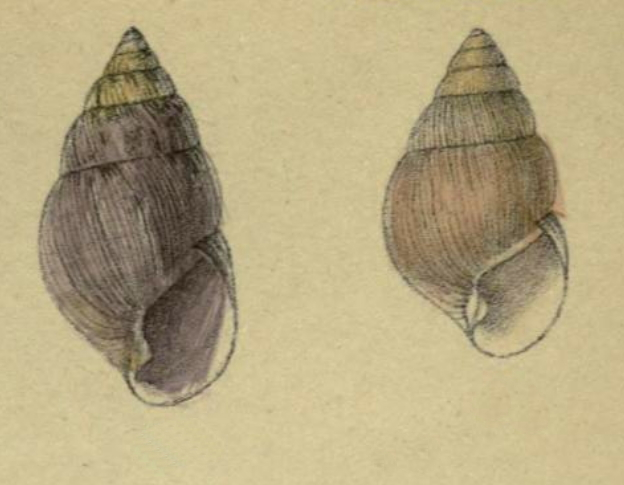
- Amastra violacea shell

Scientific classification
- Kingdom: Animalia
- Phylum: Mollusca
- Class: Gastropoda
- Order: Stylommatophora
- Family: Amastridae
- Genus: Amastra
- Species: A. violacea

Binomial name
- Amastra violacea Newcomb, 1853

Synonyms
- Achatinella violacea Newcomb, 1853 superseded combination; Amastra (Amastra) violacea (Newcomb, 1853) superseded combination

= Amastra violacea =

Species of gastropod

Amastra violacea is a species of air-breathing land snails, terrestrial pulmonate gastropod mollusks in the family Amastridae.

Subspecies

- Amastra violacea violacea (Newcomb, 1853)
- Amastra violacea wailauensis Hyatt & Pilsbry, 1911

== Description ==
The length of the shell attains 27.9 mm, its diameter 14 mm.

The shell is dextral, ovate-oblong, and solid, consisting of 7 convex whorls that are prominently striated longitudinally. The suture is plain yet deeply impressed, adding to the shell's defined appearance.

The aperture is ovate, with a short columella that ends in a distinct twisted plait. The outer lip is simple, while the shell's coloration is violaceous, adorned with lighter-colored striae for contrast.

Thetypical form is well characterized by its violaceous hue with light striae, a purplish apex, and yellowish earliest neanic whorls, with a purple interior. In some cases, the shell surface appears more worn and adopts a nearly uniform flesh tone, with the apex becoming nearly white. Fragments of the thin brown cuticle may persist, and when preserved on the spire, reveal irregular dark markings on a lighter background, indicating a relationship to A. nubilosa.

The whorls of the protoconch form a rather acute, conic summit, with the first half whorl smooth. Weak, low axial ribs develop shortly afterward. The second whorl features rather strong, arcuate ribs, which are broader than their intervals and often split or weaken near the lower suture. On the next whorl, the ribs become finer and weaker below the middle, sometimes splitting into striae. Approximately 3.5 embryonic whorls are present, with their outlines being nearly flat.

The subsequent whorls are moderately convex, with somewhat thread-like striae. These may be low or partially effaced in areas. The columellar fold is relatively small and oblique. The outer lip is thin, contributing to the shell's delicate appearance.

== Distribution ==
This species is endemic to Hawai, occurring off Halawa.
