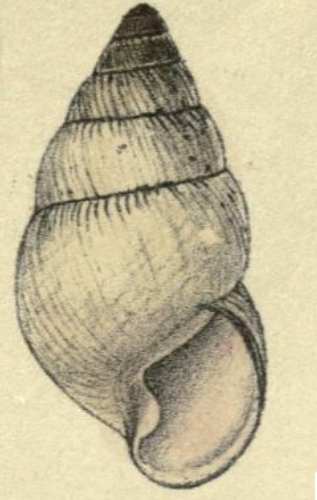
- Shell of Amastra borcherdingi (holotype)

Scientific classification
- Kingdom: Animalia
- Phylum: Mollusca
- Class: Gastropoda
- Order: Stylommatophora
- Family: Amastridae
- Genus: Amastra
- Species: A. borcherdingi

Binomial name
- Amastra borcherdingi Hyatt & Pilsbry, 1911

Synonyms
- Amastra (Amastra) borcherdingi Hyatt & Pilsbry, 1911 alternative representation

= Amastra borcherdingi =

Species of mollusc

Amastra borcherdingi is a species of air-breathing land snail, a terrestrial pulmonate gastropod mollusc in the family Amastridae.

== Description ==
The length of the shell attains 19 mm, its diameter 10.5 mm.

(Original description) The shell contains 6 1/3 whorls. The shell is ovate-conic, narrowly perforate or imperforate, and moderately robust. The upper three or four whorls are reddish-brown (rarely pale yellow), transitioning to white with a faint flesh tint on the last two whorls. These are intricately adorned with angular, zigzag, or interrupted dark brown patterns, which become chestnut with darker streaks on the last half-whorl. The cuticle is often absent near the aperture, partially worn away elsewhere, and frequently almost entirely lost in mature specimens.

The embryonic shell has flat whorls with prominent ribs, and the second whorl displays a distinct keel just above the suture. The subsequent whorls are marked by rather fine, irregular growth lines, and the body whorl occasionally exhibits obliquely descending facets or malleations.

The aperture is nearly white inside, with the outer lip slightly thickened, particularly toward the base. The columellar lamella is small and oblique, adding a subtle structural detail to the overall design.

== Distribution ==
This species is endemic to Hawaii and occurs on Molokai Island.
