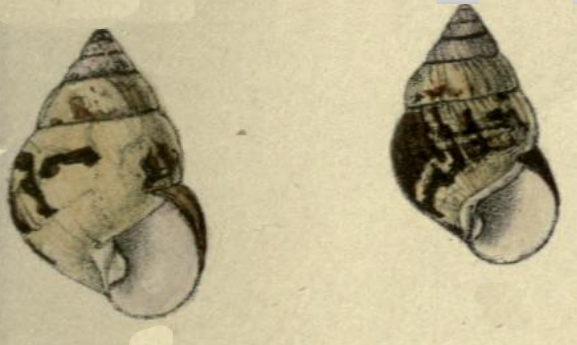
- Shell of Amastra baldwiniana (holotype)

Scientific classification
- Kingdom: Animalia
- Phylum: Mollusca
- Class: Gastropoda
- Order: Stylommatophora
- Family: Amastridae
- Genus: Amastra
- Species: A. baldwiniana

Binomial name
- Amastra baldwiniana Hyatt & Pilsbry, 1911

Synonyms
- Amastra (Amastra) baldwiniana Hyatt & Pilsbry, 1911 alternative representation

= Amastra baldwiniana =

Species of mollusc

Amastra baldwiniana is a species of air-breathing land snail, a terrestrial pulmonate gastropod mollusc in the family Amastridae.

Subspecies

- Amastra baldwiniana kahakuloensis Pilsbry & C. M. Cooke, 1914

== Description ==
The length of the shell attains 22.7 mm, its diameter 13.1 mm.

(Original description) The shell contains 6½ whorls. The shell is imperforate, globose-conic, and moderately solid, with a very pale brown or creamy-white base color beneath a thin, somewhat glossy dark-brown cuticle streaked with black. The cuticle may be inconspicuous or absent on the upper part of the body whorl. When retained on the penultimate whorl, the cuticle is irregularly mottled or angularly streaked, resembling Amastra nigra. The light streaks on the body whorl may show faint traces of spiral bands.

The shell's substance is uniformly white or occasionally purplish-brown on the spire. The spire is straightly conic, sometimes slightly contracted near the apex. The first half-whorl is smooth, transitioning to a strongly costate and carinate texture above the suture on the next whorl. The following whorls become more finely ribbed. Later whorls feature fine growth lines, with the body whorl being smooth or occasionally exhibiting a spirally malleated texture and very convex in shape.

The aperture is short, white inside, and slightly thickened near the outer lip. The columellar lamella is strong and very oblique, while the parietal callus is thin, adding a delicate finishing detail to the shell's structure.

== Distribution ==
This species is endemic to Hawaii and occurs on Maui Island.
