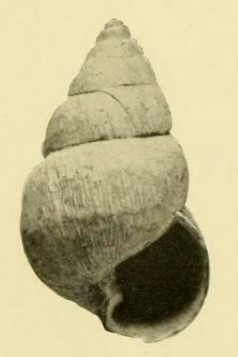
- Shell of Amastra hitchcocki (holotype)

Scientific classification
- Kingdom: Animalia
- Phylum: Mollusca
- Class: Gastropoda
- Order: Stylommatophora
- Family: Amastridae
- Genus: Amastra
- Species: A. hitchcocki

Binomial name
- Amastra hitchcocki C. M. Cooke, 1917

Synonyms
- Amastra (Amastra) hitchcocki C. M. Cooke, 1917 alternative representation

= Amastra hitchcocki =

Species of gastropod

Amastra hitchcocki is a species of air-breathing land snail, a terrestrial pulmonate gastropod mollusc in the family Amastridae.

== Description ==
The length of the shell attains 39 mm, its diameter 21.3 mm.

(Original description) The shell is imperforate, conic-ovate, and large, appearing white in its fossilized state. The spire has a conical outline above, transitioning to slightly convex outlines below.

The whorls of the protoconch are conical and very finely striated. The outlines of the first five whorls are nearly straight, while the two lower whorls are distinctly convex. The body whorl is rounded and tapers toward the base, featuring very coarse, irregular growth striae, especially pronounced near the aperture. It also exhibits a faintly malleate texture.

The aperture is moderately sized, and the columella is nearly straight, adorned with a rather strong and slightly oblique fold.

== Distribution ==
This species is endemic to Hawai, occurring on Molokai Island.
