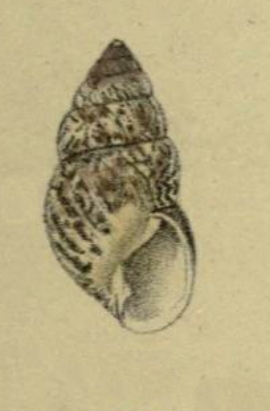
- Amastra nubilosa shell

Scientific classification
- Kingdom: Animalia
- Phylum: Mollusca
- Class: Gastropoda
- Order: Stylommatophora
- Family: Amastridae
- Genus: Amastra
- Species: A. nubilosa

Binomial name
- Amastra nubilosa (Mighels, 1845)

Synonyms
- Achatinella nubilosa Mighels, 1845 superseded combination; Amastra (Amastra) nubilosa (Mighels, 1845) alternative representation

= Amastra nubilosa =

Species of gastropod

Amastra nubilosa is a species of air-breathing land snails, terrestrial pulmonate gastropod mollusks in the family Amastridae.

Subspecies

- Amastra nubilosa georgii Pilsbry & C. M. Cooke, 1914
- Amastra nubilosa macerata Hyatt & Pilsbry, 1911
- Amastra nubilosa nubilosa (Mighels, 1845)

== Description ==
The length of the shell attains 22.3 mm, its diameter 11 mm.

The shell is imperforate, oblong-conic, moderately robust, and lusterless. The apical whorls vary in color from white to light brown or pink, while the remaining whorls are cream-white and adorned with a thin cuticle. This cuticle features intricate olive-brown zigzag or V-shaped markings and narrow streaks, which often merge near the outer lip but are absent in front of the aperture.

The spire is slightly convexly conic, with the penultimate whorl showing some degree of bulging. The second embryonic whorl displays fine, closely spaced, curved striae, while the subsequent whorl exhibits weaker striae except near the suture. The later whorls are decorated with low growth wrinkles, more pronounced near the suture. Both the penultimate and final whorls are distinctly convex.

The shell's thin cuticle is characterized by distinctive zigzag or V-shaped olive-brown markings on a very pale background, contributing to its unique appearance. This variegation is often accentuated by the partial loss of the cuticle. While most specimens display these zigzag patterns, a few may lack them, exhibiting only subtle mottling or streaking. On the latter half of the body whorl, the cuticle may appear predominantly dark with occasional light streaks. In some cases, the cuticle is significantly or entirely worn away.

The aperture is white, with a thin and acute outer lip, although in larger shells it may be thickened internally. The columellar lamella is strong, and the parietal callus is thin and white, adding to the overall delicate yet robust appearance of the shell.

The animal is tessellated with a striking pattern of black and gray when in motion. The tentacles are deep black, while the underside of the foot and the mantle are a rich dark brown.

== Distribution ==
This species is endemic to Hawai, occurring on Molokai Island.
