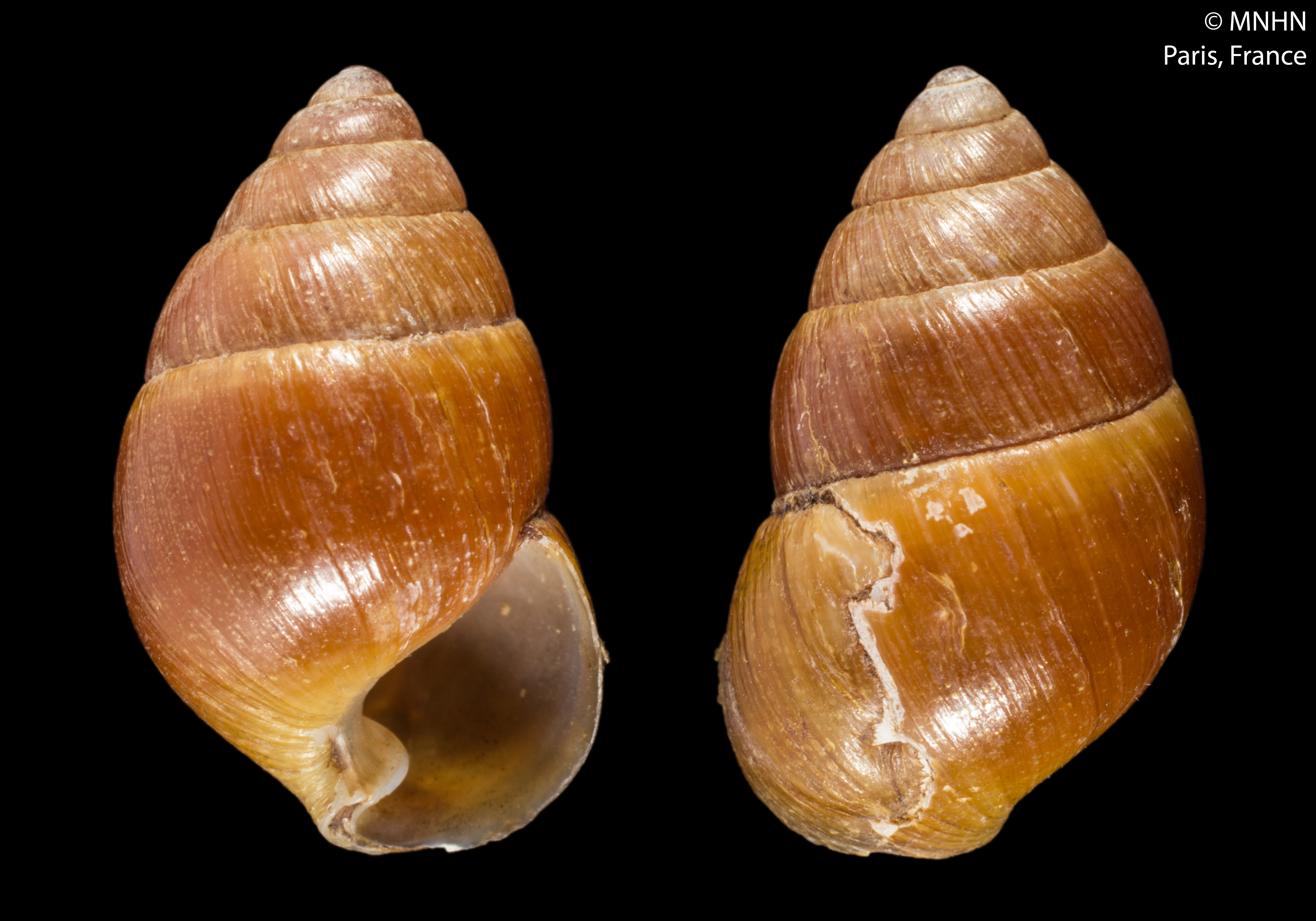
- Shell of Helix textilis (syntype at MNHN, Paris)

Scientific classification
- Kingdom: Animalia
- Phylum: Mollusca
- Class: Gastropoda
- Order: Stylommatophora
- Family: Amastridae
- Genus: Amastra
- Species: A. textilis

Binomial name
- Amastra textilis (Quoy & Gaimard, 1825)
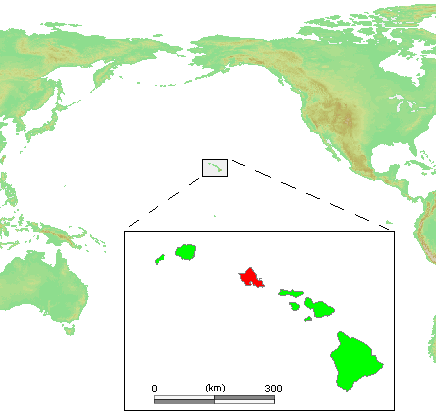
- Location of Oʻahu

Synonyms
- Achatinella (Leptachatina) textilis (Quoy & Gaimard, 1825) superseded combination; Achatinella ellipsoidea A. Gould, 1847 junior subjective synonym; Achatinella microstoma A. Gould, 1845 junior subjective synonym; Amastra (Metamastra) cookei Hyatt & Pilsbry, 1911 junior subjective synonym; Amastra (Metamastra) textilis (Quoy & Gaimard, 1825) alternative representation; Amastra cookei Hyatt & Pilsbry, 1911 junior subjective synonym; Helix textilis Quoy & Gaimard, 1825 superseded combination

= Amastra textilis =

Species of gastropod

Amastra textilis is a species of air-breathing land snail, a terrestrial pulmonate gastropod mollusc in the family Amastridae.

Subspecies

- Amastra textilis kaipaupauensis Hyatt & Pilsbry, 1911
- Amastra textilis media Hyatt & Pilsbry, 1911
- Amastra textilis textilis (Quoy & Gaimard, 1825)

== Description ==
The length of the shell can reach 15 mm, its diameter 8.5 mm

Amastra textilis is imperforate or occasionally slightly rimate, solid, oblong-conic, and polished, with weak sculpture consisting of fine, uneven growth wrinkles. The shell's color is a rich chestnut, varying in intensity, with paler or yellow areas typically observed below the suture and around the columella. The spire is purplish-brown. In some specimens, the chestnut hue transitions to yellowish tones or even exhibits olive or greenish tints.

Certain yellow shells display numerous indistinct olive-brown spiral lines, sometimes slightly sunken. Aging shells often feature scattered golden flecks or whitish lines and dots resulting from cuticle disintegration.

The spire is characterized by convex outlines near the base, becoming straight closer to the apex. The shell consists of 5½ to 6½ whorls that are only slightly convex. The second embryonic whorl is finely and closely striate longitudinally, occasionally intersected by smooth spiral bands in some specimens. The body whorl is somewhat convex.

The aperture is small and rather oblique, with a flesh-colored interior. The outer lip is reinforced by a narrow whitish rib within the acute edge. The columellar lamella is prominent, strong, and nearly horizontal. there is a sort of gutter at the junction of the columellar and basal margins. The parietal callus is usually rather thick, but thin at the edge and transparent.

== Distribution ==
This species is endemic to Hawai, occurring on Oʻahu.
