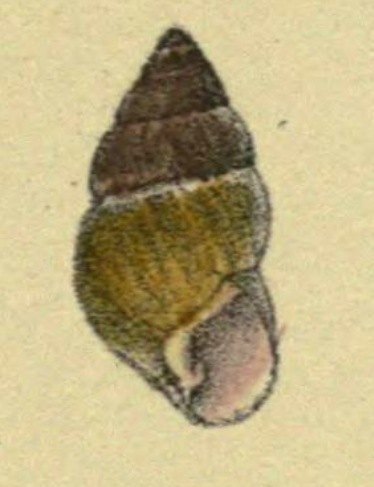
- Shell of Amastra luctuosa

Scientific classification
- Kingdom: Animalia
- Phylum: Mollusca
- Class: Gastropoda
- Order: Stylommatophora
- Family: Amastridae
- Genus: Amastra
- Species: A. luctuosa

Binomial name
- Amastra luctuosa (L. Pfeiffer, 1856)

Synonyms
- Achatinella (Laminella) luctuosa L. Pfeiffer, 1856 alternative representation; Amastra (Amastra) luctuosa (L. Pfeiffer, 1856) alternative representation

= Amastra luctuosa =

Species of mollusc

Amastra luctuosa is a species of air-breathing land snail, a terrestrial pulmonate gastropod mollusc in the family Amastridae.

Subspecies: Amastra luctuosa sulphurea Ancey, 1904

== Description ==
The length of the shell attains 16 mm, its diameter 8 mm

The shell is imperforate, dextral, oblong-conic, and solid, with fine striations and a slight sheen. It is distinctly bicolored, with a striking contrast between light and dark tones. The spire is inflated-conic, tapering to an acute apex, and the suture is finely crenulated.

There are 6 whorls, with the upper four being black and nearly flat, the penultimate whorl pale and more convex, and the body whorl comprising about two-fifths of the total shell length. The body whorl is pale tawny above and blackish below the periphery.

The aperture is slightly oblique, sinuate-semioval, and white inside. The columellar fold is laminiform, subbasal, and triangular. The peristome is unexpanded, acute, and edged in black, adding to the shell's sharp and elegant appearance.

== Distribution ==
This species is endemic to Hawaii, occurring on Oahu island.
