= Amastra juddii =

Scientific classification
- Kingdom: Animalia
- Phylum: Mollusca
- Class: Gastropoda
- Order: Stylommatophora
- Family: Amastridae
- Genus: Amastra
- Species: A. juddii

Binomial name
- Amastra juddii C. M. Cooke, 1917

Synonyms
- Amastra (Cyclamastra) juddii C. M. Cooke, 1917 alternative representation

Species of gastropod

Amastra juddii is a species of air-breathing land snail, a terrestrial pulmonate gastropod mollusc in the family Amastridae.

== Description ==
The length of the shell attains 11.5 mm, its diameter 5.5 mm.

(Original description) The shell is perforate, dextral, conic, and thin, with a nearly smooth surface irregularly sculptured by distant, blunt growth wrinkles. In its fossilized state, it has a dirty whitish coloration. The spire is conical with nearly straight outlines.

The whorls of the protoconch are worn, nearly smooth, and convex, while the subsequent whorls are slightly convex. The body whorl is large, rounded, and tapers gradually toward the base. The aperture is large, very oblique, and subquadrate in outline, with a prominently convex outer margin. It is reinforced by a thick, broad lip rib and is obtusely angled at the base of the columella, which is covered with a thick parietal callus.

The columellar fold is basal, relatively strong, and subtransverse, terminating abruptly behind the columellar margin. The umbilicus is small and cleft-like, nearly closed off by the thickened callus of the outer margin of the columella.

== Distribution ==
This species is endemic to Hawai, occurring on Kauai Island.
