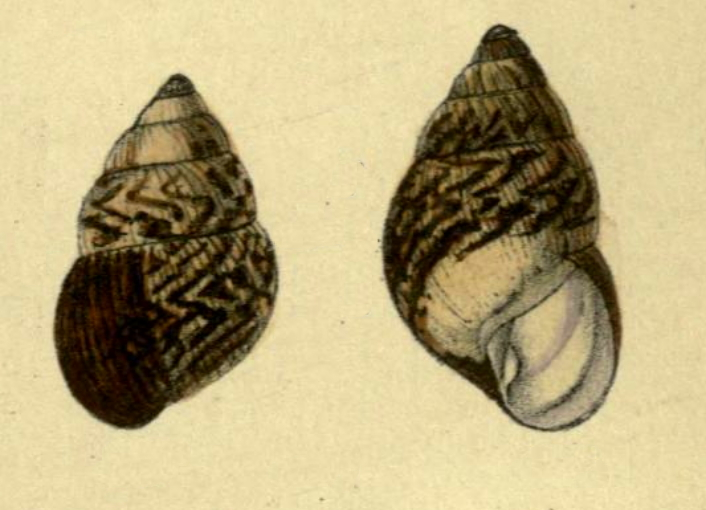
- Shell of Amastra nana

Scientific classification
- Kingdom: Animalia
- Phylum: Mollusca
- Class: Gastropoda
- Order: Stylommatophora
- Family: Amastridae
- Genus: Amastra
- Species: A. nana

Binomial name
- Amastra nana (Baldwin, 1895)

Synonyms
- Achatinella (Amastra) nana Baldwin, 1895 superseded combination; Amastra (Amastra) nana (Baldwin, 1895) alternative representation

= Amastra nana =

Species of mollusc

Amastra nana is a species of air-breathing land snail, a terrestrial pulmonate gastropod mollusc in the family Amastridae.

== Description ==
The length of the shell attains 11.5 mm, its diameter 6.5 mm.

(Original description) The shell contains 6 1/2 whorls. When fully extended in motion, the animal is as long as its shell. The mantle is light brown, while the foot is brown on both the upper and lower surfaces, with darker spots along the sides. The tentacles and the anterior portion of the head are nearly black, providing a striking contrast.

(Later supplemental description by Hyatt, A. & Pilsbry, H. A.) The shell is rimate, ovate-conic, and thin, with an impure whitish or pale brown coloration. The apex is dark brown, and the surface, except near the aperture, is covered with a brown or olivaceous-brown cuticle adorned with light streaks or zigzag stripes.

The shell of the protoconch is distinctly costate and carinate, while the later whorls are sculpted with irregular wrinkle-like striations. The spire has nearly straight outlines, with the whorls being only slightly convex.

The aperture is relatively small, with the lip somewhat thickened on the interior. The columellar fold is sharp and well-defined.

== Distribution ==
This species is endemic to Hawaii, occurring on Maui Island.
