= Amastra nubifera =

Scientific classification
- Kingdom: Animalia
- Phylum: Mollusca
- Class: Gastropoda
- Order: Stylommatophora
- Family: Amastridae
- Genus: Amastra
- Species: A. nubifera

Binomial name
- Amastra nubifera Hyatt & Pilsbry, 1911

Synonyms
- Amastra (Amastra) nubifera Hyatt & Pilsbry, 1911 alternative representation

Species of mollusc

Amastra nubifera is a species of air-breathing land snail, a terrestrial pulmonate gastropod mollusc in the family Amastridae.

Subspecies

- Amastra nubifera dissimiliceps Hyatt & Pilsbry, 1911
- Amastra nubifera nubifera Hyatt & Pilsbry, 1911

== Description ==
The length of the shell attains 12.5 mm, its diameter 7.3 mm.

(Original description) The shell contains 5½ whorls. The shell is subperforate or imperforate, ovate-conic, and relatively thin, with a surface that is only faintly glossy. The spire has straight outlines, giving it a clean, conic shape.

The first half-whorl is smooth or nearly so, followed by a whorl with low, coarse ribs that are weakly defined, accompanied by an indistinct keel situated just above the suture. The next whorl is very finely ribbed, transitioning into weakly convex whorls adorned with delicate growth-wrinkle sculpture.

The shell's coloration beneath the cuticle is pale reddish-brown above the periphery, with the first three whorls a rich dark purple-brown and the base white. The cuticle is thin and smooth, presenting a variety of patterns: pale with olive angular or disjointed stripes near the aperture, and olive with darker longitudinal streaks and mottling toward the back of the body whorl.

The aperture is bluish or fleshy-white inside, with a thin, sharp outer lip. The columellar lamella is moderate in size and strongly oblique, adding to the shell's structural elegance.

== Distribution ==
This species is endemic to Hawaii, occurring on Molokai Island.
