= Amastra montagui =

Scientific classification
- Kingdom: Animalia
- Phylum: Mollusca
- Class: Gastropoda
- Order: Stylommatophora
- Family: Amastridae
- Genus: Amastra
- Species: A. montagui

Binomial name
- Amastra montagui Pilsbry, 1913

Synonyms
- Amastra (Metamastra) montagui Pilsbry, 1913 · alternative representation

Species of gastropod

Amastra montagui is a species of air-breathing land snail, a terrestrial pulmonate gastropod mollusc in the family Amastridae.

== Description ==
The length of the shell attains 13 mm, its diameter 7.8 mm.

(Original description) Amastra montagui is a sinistral, imperforate, relatively thin oblong-conic shell. It is chestnut-colored with a denuded ecru-olive patch in front of the aperture. The surface exhibits a subtle silky sheen due to the presence of fine growth wrinkles.

The apex is obtuse, and the whorls of the protoconch are convex and nearly smooth. The spire displays noticeably convex outlines, with a well-impressed suture accentuating the slightly swollen appearance of the whorls just below it.

The aperture is moderately oblique and slate-violet on the interior. The peristome is black-edged and reinforced internally by a faint white callus. The columella features a reflexed and adnate edge adorned with a prominent, white, subtriangular lamella.

== Distribution ==
This species is endemic to Hawaii, occurring on Oahu Island.
