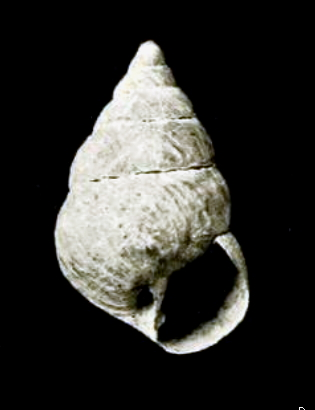
- Shell of Amastra fragosa (holotype)

Scientific classification
- Kingdom: Animalia
- Phylum: Mollusca
- Class: Gastropoda
- Order: Stylommatophora
- Family: Amastridae
- Genus: Amastra
- Species: A. fragosa

Binomial name
- Amastra fragosa C. M. Cooke, 1917

Synonyms
- Amastra (Amastrella) fragosa C. M. Cooke, 1917 alternative representation

= Amastra fragosa =

Species of gastropod

Amastra fragosa is a species of air-breathing land snail, a terrestrial pulmonate gastropod mollusc in the family Amastridae.

== Description ==
The length of the shell attains 13.7 mm, its diameter 8 mm.

(Original description) The shell is narrowly umbilicate, dextral, and conic, with a very thin structure. In its fossil state, it appears as a pale, dirty white. The spire is acutely conical, tapering sharply and slightly contracted near the apex. Its outlines are subtly concave, culminating in a very acute tip.

The whorls of the protoconch are elongate, nearly flat, and very faintly marked with minute striations. The subsequent whorls are indistinctly flattened above, convex below, and subtly shouldered near the sutures. They are irregularly sculpted with coarse, oblique growth wrinkles.

The body whorl is rounded and tapers toward the base, showing slight contraction around the umbilicus. The aperture is somewhat oblique and slightly contracted near its upper margin, with the outer edge thin and consistently strongly arched.

The columella is narrowly triangular, with its inner margin slightly oblique and its outer margin thin and gently arched above the umbilicus. The columellar fold is not particularly strong, nearly transverse, and tapers gradually toward the outer margin of the columella.

The umbilicus is subcircular, with a rounded and slightly contracted margin that appears enlarged internally.

In some adult specimens of this species, there is a subtle tendency to develop an indistinct angle at the periphery. However, when this feature is present, it does not affect the margin of the aperture, as the angle fades away before reaching it.

== Distribution ==
This species is endemic to Hawai, occurring in Pleistocene strata.
