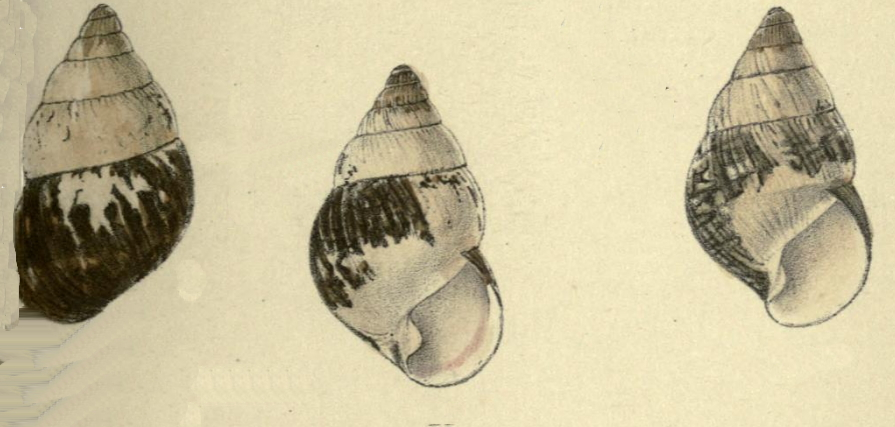
- Shell of Amastra conifera (holotype)

Scientific classification
- Domain: Eukaryota
- Kingdom: Animalia
- Phylum: Mollusca
- Class: Gastropoda
- Order: Stylommatophora
- Family: Amastridae
- Genus: Amastra
- Species: A. conifera

Binomial name
- Amastra conifera E. A. Smith, 1873

Synonyms
- Amastra (Amastra) conifera E. A. Smith, 1873 alternative representation

= Amastra conifera =

Species of mollusc

Amastra conifera is a species of air-breathing land snail, a terrestrial pulmonate gastropod mollusc in the family Amastridae.

== Description ==
The length of the shell attains 17 mm, its diameter 9 mm

The shell is ovate-conic, dextral, and delicately striated with growth lines. Its coloration is a very pale reddish hue, partially covered by a brownish-olivaceous epidermis. It comprises 6½ whorls that are slightly convex. The initial 2½ to 3 whorls are reddish, prominently radially sulcate, and adorned with a distinct spiral cord at the base.

The suture is simple and unadorned. The aperture is whitish, while the peristome is thin, blackish, and slightly thickened. The columellar fold is slender and well-defined.

The aperture is strongly oblique, with a thin outer lip. The columella is straight, its edge narrowly reflexed and adnate above, bearing a small, very oblique fold.

All specimens are imperforate and thin, with spire outlines that are either straight or slightly contracted near the apex. The coloration varies as follows:

- Pale Variation: Very pale reddish, transitioning to a lighter, creamy tone on the last whorl.
- Two-Tone Variation: Spire is a darker reddish-brown with a distinct white sutural border, while the body whorl is cream-white.
- Creamy Variation: Uniform cream-white throughout, with only the embryonic whorls showing a reddish-brown hue.

The thin, olive or olive-brown cuticle is typically absent from most of the shell above the body whorl. Where retained on the penultimate whorl and the front of the body whorl, it features angular dark patterns or light mottling on a darker ground, forming a network. On the latter part of the body whorl, the cuticle becomes continuous except where worn.

The apex exhibits the characteristic costate and carinate structure. The body whorl is angular at the periphery, with the angle generally sharp and distinct in front, though it can occasionally appear subdued.

Older shells may develop a very thin callus within the lip, but this feature is typically faint. In the type specimen, the edge of the lip retains a blackish cuticular margin, which is absent in other examples.

== Distribution ==
This species is endemic to Hawaii, occurring on Maui island.
