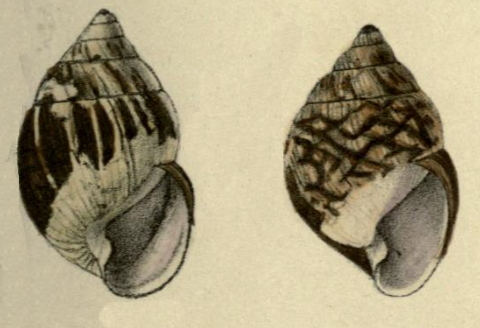
- Shell of Amastra montana

Scientific classification
- Kingdom: Animalia
- Phylum: Mollusca
- Class: Gastropoda
- Order: Stylommatophora
- Family: Amastridae
- Genus: Amastra
- Species: A. montana

Binomial name
- Amastra montana Baldwin, 1906

Synonyms
- Amastra (Amastra) montana Baldwin, 1896 alternative representation

= Amastra montana =

Species of mollusc

Amastra montana is a species of air-breathing land snail, a terrestrial pulmonate gastropod mollusc in the family Amastridae.

== Description ==
The length of the shell attains 14 mm, its diameter 9.5 mm.

(Later supplemental description by Hyatt, A. & Pilsbry, H. A.) The shell is imperforate, ovate-conic, and thin, with a spire that is straightly conic but slightly concave near the apex. It is covered, except near the aperture, with a blackish-brown cuticle adorned with copious yellowish streaks or zigzag stripes.

The initial half-whorl is smooth, while the whorls of the protoconch are coarsely ribbed, with the ribs protractively angled and terminating in a carina above the suture. On the following whorl, the ribs become finer and shorter, eventually disappearing. The neanic and subsequent whorls are finely marked with growth lines, and a peripheral carina is typically visible above the suture, extending to and occasionally upon the penultimate whorl.

The whorls of the spire are nearly flat, and the body whorl is large and inflated. The aperture is whitish inside, with a thin, acute outer lip. The columellar fold is median, oblique, and relatively thin.

The holotype is streaked with yellow but lacks zigzag markings. Other shells within the type series exhibit longitudinal zigzag stripes, which occasionally interconnect to form a network-like pattern.

The animal, when extended in motion, is as long as the shell. The mantle is dark brown with a lighter brown border. The foot and tentacles are nearly black, while the head is coarsely granulated on the dorsal side.

== Distribution ==
This species is endemic to Hawaii, occurring on Maui Island.
