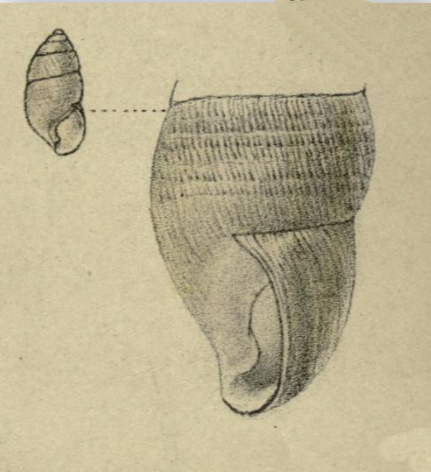
- Shell of Amastra caputadamantis (holotype)

Scientific classification
- Kingdom: Animalia
- Phylum: Mollusca
- Class: Gastropoda
- Order: Stylommatophora
- Family: Amastridae
- Genus: Amastra
- Species: A. caputadamantis

Binomial name
- Amastra caputadamantis Hyatt & Pilsbry, 1911

Synonyms
- Amastra (Metamastra) caputadamantis Hyatt & Pilsbry, 1911 alternative representation

= Amastra caputadamantis =

Species of mollusc

Amastra caputadamantis is a species of air-breathing land snail, a terrestrial pulmonate gastropod mollusc in the family Amastridae.

== Description ==
The length of the shell attains 14.5 mm, its diameter 7.3 mm.

(Original description) The shell is cylindric-oblong and somewhat thin, with the penultimate whorl nearly equal in diameter to the body whorl. This gives the spire a bulging appearance at the base, tapering rapidly into a short cone.

The surface is finely striated axially, with these striae intersected on the last two whorls by incised spiral lines, which may be faint or nearly erased in some specimens. The shell consists of 5¾ to 6 slightly convex whorls, with the body whorl laterally compressed.

The aperture is small and semi-oval, angular at both ends. The outer lip is obtuse and thickened on the inner side. The columellar lamella is small and positioned near the base. The columellar lip is reflexed and adnate, with the axis being imperforate or displaying a short, narrow crevice.

As fossils, the shells are chalky white, reflecting their preserved state.

== Distribution ==
This species is endemic to Hawaii and occurs on Oahu Island.
