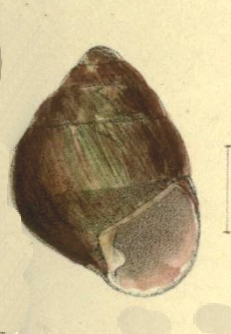
- Shell of Amastra gulickiana

Scientific classification
- Kingdom: Animalia
- Phylum: Mollusca
- Class: Gastropoda
- Order: Stylommatophora
- Family: Amastridae
- Genus: Amastra
- Species: A. gulickiana

Binomial name
- Amastra gulickiana Hyatt & Pilsbry, 1911

Synonyms
- Amastra (Metamastra) gulickiana Hyatt & Pilsbry, 1911 alternative representation

= Amastra gulickiana =

Species of mollusc

Amastra gulickiana is a species of air-breathing land snail, a terrestrial pulmonate gastropod mollusc in the family Amastridae.

Subspecies

- Amastra gulickiana dichroma C. M. Cooke, 1933
- Amastra gulickiana gulickiana Hyatt & Pilsbry, 1911

== Description ==
The length of the shell attains 10 mm, its diameter 7.7 mm

The shell is narrowly perforate, globose-conic, rather solid, and glossy, with no dull or deciduous outer cuticle. The spire is very short, with outlines that are nearly straight to very slightly convex, ending in an obtuse summit.

The shell contains 5 1/3 whorls. The whorls of the protoconch are nearly smooth, with the first being dull purple and the rest covered by a thin, light greenish-yellow cuticle, transitioning to reddish-brown on the latter part of the body whorl. Subsequent whorls are lightly marked with growth striae and are less convex than the embryonic whorls. The body whorl is subglobose, subangular in front of the aperture, and becomes fully rounded in its last two-thirds.

The aperture is somewhat oblique, with a purple interior that becomes paler and slightly thickened near the lip. The columella is short, featuring a moderate, not overly oblique fold below its middle, with the edge dilated above the fold. The parietal callus is thin and purple, complementing the overall structure.

== Distribution ==
This vary rare species is endemic to Hawaii, occurring on Oahu island.
