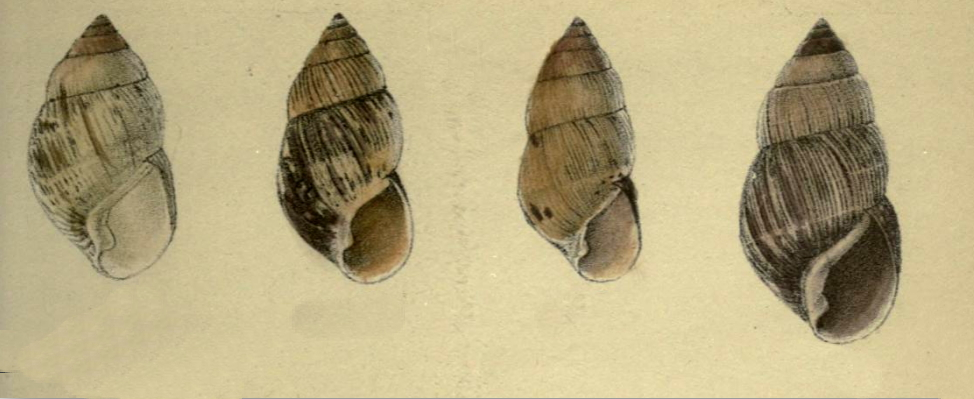
- Shell of Amastra magna

Scientific classification
- Kingdom: Animalia
- Phylum: Mollusca
- Class: Gastropoda
- Order: Stylommatophora
- Family: Amastridae
- Genus: Amastra
- Species: A. magna

Binomial name
- Amastra magna (C. B. Adams, 1851)

Synonyms
- Achatinella baldwinii Newcomb, 1854 junior subjective synonym; Achatinella gigantea Newcomb, 1854 junior subjective synonym; Achatinella magna C. B. Adams, 1851 (original combination); Amastra (Amastra) magna C. B. Adams, 1851 alternative representation

= Amastra magna =

Species of mollusc

Amastra magna is a species of air-breathing land snail, a terrestrial pulmonate gastropod mollusc in the family Amastridae.

Subspecies

- Amastra magna balteata Hyatt & Pilsbry, 1911
- Amastra magna magna (C. B. Adams, 1851)

== Description ==
The shell is robust, ovate-conic, and elongate, with a distinct coloration: blackish-brown at the apex, transitioning to reddish-brown on the middle whorls, and ash-colored on the lower whorls. Its surface is adorned with irregular, coarse, and unequal transverse striae, accompanied by closely spaced, arcuate ribs near the apex. Indistinct raised spiral lines are present on the lower portion of the body whorl.

The apex is subacute, and the spire is relatively long, featuring gracefully curvilinear outlines. The shell is composed of seven slightly convex whorls with a well-defined, deeply impressed suture. The body whorl is obtusely angular.

The aperture is ovate and sharply acute at the upper end, with an extremely thickened deposit along the inner margin. A prominent, large, and compressed columellar fold adds to the distinctive morphology.

== Distribution ==
This species is endemic to Hawaii, occurring on Lanai Island.
