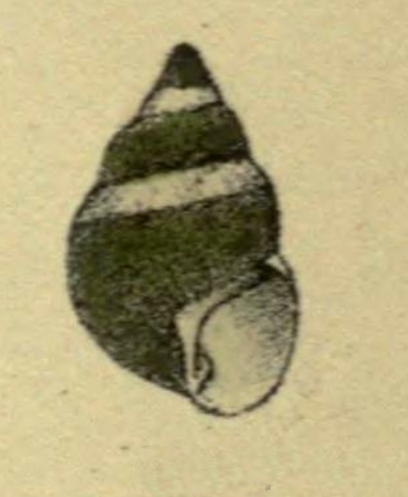
- Shell of Amastra tenuilabris

Scientific classification
- Kingdom: Animalia
- Phylum: Mollusca
- Class: Gastropoda
- Order: Stylommatophora
- Family: Amastridae
- Genus: Amastra
- Species: A. tenuilabris

Binomial name
- Amastra tenuilabris Gulick, 1873

Synonyms
- Amastra (Amastrella) tenuilabris E. A. C. M. Cooke, 1908 alternative representation

= Amastra tenuilabris =

Species of mollusc

Amastra tenuilabris is a species of air-breathing land snail, a terrestrial pulmonate gastropod mollusc in the family Amastridae.

Subspecies: Amastra tenuilabris rubicunda (Baldwin, 1895)

== Description ==
The length of the shell attains 15 mm, its diameter 8 mm

The shell is dextral, ovate-conic, and slightly dull, marked with somewhat coarse growth striations. It is white, overlain by a tawny epidermis that tends to wear away below the suture on the body whorl. There are 5½ whorls, which are gently convex. The aperture is subquadrate, white, and shorter than the spire. The peristome is thin, and the columella is straight, featuring a small central fold. The lips are joined by a delicate, thin callus.

== Distribution ==
This species is endemic to Hawaii, occurring on Oahu island.
