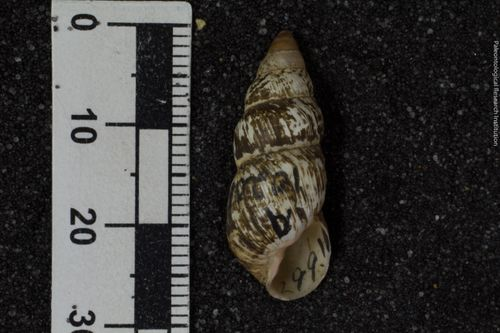

Scientific classification
- Kingdom: Animalia
- Phylum: Mollusca
- Class: Gastropoda
- Order: Stylommatophora
- Family: Amastridae
- Genus: Amastra
- Species: A. biplicata

Binomial name
- Amastra biplicata (Newcomb, 1854)

Synonyms
- Achatinella biplicata Newcomb, 1854 superseded combination; Amastra (Amastra) biplicata (Newcomb, 1854) alternative representation

= Amastra biplicata =

Species of gastropod

Amastra biplicata was a species of air-breathing land snails, terrestrial pulmonate gastropod mollusks in the family Amastridae.

== Description ==
(Original description) The shell is dextrorsal and elongately cylindrical, composed of seven rounded whorls with pronounced longitudinal striations. The suture is deep, and the small aperture is subovate. The inner lip is somewhat callous, while the columella is biplicate. The outer lip is acute and subtly submarginate internally.

The shell is rosy, partially veiled by a thin brown epidermis, with the upper whorls appearing black. The aperture interior is a vivid red.

== Distribution ==
This marine species is endemic to Hawaii and occurs on Lanai Island.
