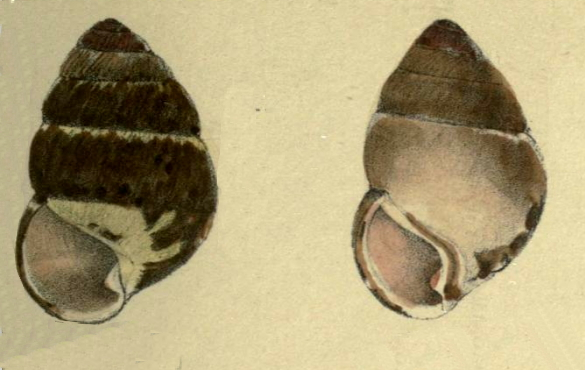
- Shell of Amastra thaamuni (holotype)

Scientific classification
- Kingdom: Animalia
- Phylum: Mollusca
- Class: Gastropoda
- Order: Stylommatophora
- Family: Amastridae
- Genus: Amastra
- Species: A. thaamuni

Binomial name
- Amastra thaamuni Hyatt & Pilsbry, 1911

Synonyms
- Amastra (Metamastra) thaamuni Hyatt & Pilsbry, 1911 alternative representation

= Amastra thaamuni =

Species of mollusc

Amastra thaamuni is a species of air-breathing land snail, a terrestrial pulmonate gastropod mollusc in the family Amastridae.

== Description ==
The length of the shell attains 14.98 mm, its diameter 9.5 mm.

(Original description) The shell contains 6 whorls. The shell is sinistral, imperforate, and moderately solid, with an oblong shape and a somewhat silky luster. The spire is broadly conic with slightly convex outlines and a relatively obtuse summit.

The whorls of the protoconch are marked only by faint, very fine growth striae, while the later whorls exhibit distinct, oblique striation with fine, thread-like ridges. The upper whorls are purplish-brown with irregular whitish streaks, and the last two whorls are covered by a rich, dark chestnut cuticle. This cuticle is yellowish near the suture and becomes deciduous in front of the aperture, revealing a glossy, light green underlayer beneath.

The aperture is moderately oblique, with a livid or bluish-white interior. A whitish callous rim lines the interior of the dark-edged lip. The columella is short and bears a strong, triangular lamella that bends downward. The parietal callus is thin.

== Distribution ==
This species is endemic to Hawaii, occurring on Oahu Island.
