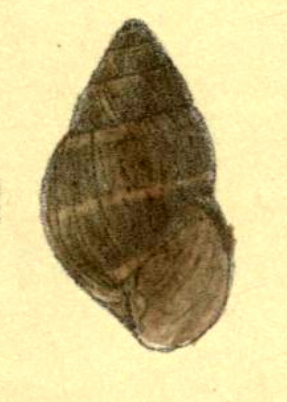
- Shell of Amastra tricincta (holotype)

Scientific classification
- Kingdom: Animalia
- Phylum: Mollusca
- Class: Gastropoda
- Order: Stylommatophora
- Family: Amastridae
- Genus: Amastra
- Species: A. tricincta

Binomial name
- Amastra tricincta Hyatt & Pilsbry, 1911

Synonyms
- Amastra (Amastra) tricincta Hyatt & Pilsbry, 1911 alternative representation

= Amastra tricincta =

Species of mollusc

Amastra tricincta is a species of air-breathing land snail, a terrestrial pulmonate gastropod mollusc in the family Amastridae.

== Description ==
The length of the shell attains 1–8.8 mm, its diameter 5 mm.

(Original description) The shell contains 5 whorls. The shell is perforate, ovate-conic, very small, and thin, with a slight sheen. The spire's outlines are nearly straight. The whorls of the protoconch are somewhat convex, with the first half nearly smooth and carinate just above the suture. The subsequent whorl is very finely costulate or sharply striate, with a subtle angularity near the suture.

The later whorls are moderately convex, adorned with fine, irregular growth wrinkles. The body whorl is rounded at the periphery. The shell is dark brown, with the body whorl featuring opaque white revolving bands at the suture, periphery, and around the umbilical slit. It also bears several narrow, obliquely longitudinal black streaks, while the upper whorls are reddish-brown.

The aperture is dark within, displaying a distinct median white band. The outer lip is thin and acute. The columella is dark, with a thin but strongly oblique lamella.

== Distribution ==
This species is endemic to Hawaii, occurring on Molokai Island.
