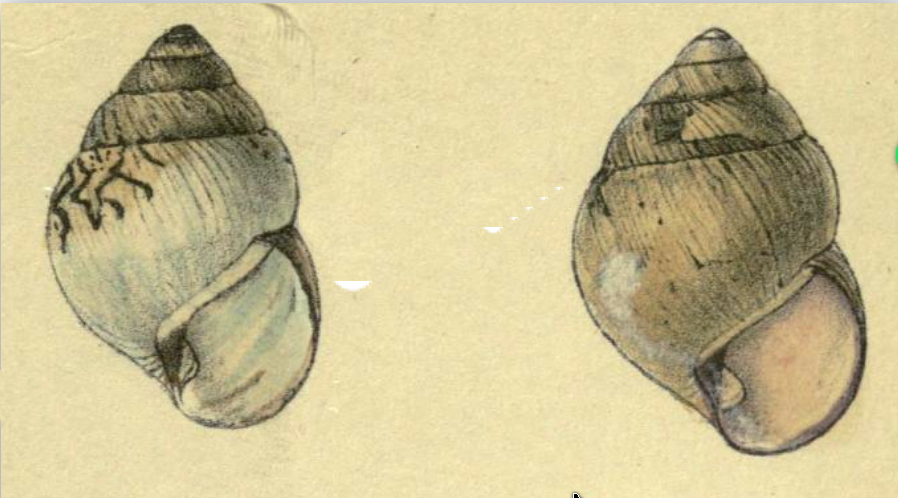
- Shell of Amastra sykesi (holotype)

Scientific classification
- Kingdom: Animalia
- Phylum: Mollusca
- Class: Gastropoda
- Order: Stylommatophora
- Family: Amastridae
- Genus: Amastra
- Species: A. sykesi

Binomial name
- Amastra sykesi Hyatt & Pilsbry, 1911

Synonyms
- Amastra (Amastra) sykesi Hyatt & Pilsbry, 1911 alternative representation

= Amastra sykesi =

Species of mollusc

Amastra sykesi is a species of air-breathing land snail, a terrestrial pulmonate gastropod mollusc in the family Amastridae.

== Description ==
The length of the shell attains 11 mm, its diameter 7.5 mm.

(Original description) The shell contains 5½ whorls. The shell is subrimate, globose-conic, and thin, with a dull, non-shiny surface. After the smooth initial half-whorl, it transitions into a flat, strongly costate whorl, featuring a carina that is partially concealed within the suture. The next whorl is costulate only near the suture, with its lower portion smooth.

The following whorls are weakly convex, finely marked with growth wrinkles that become slightly more pronounced on the globose body whorl. The coloration varies: the shell may be fleshy-ochraceous with faint angular brown markings on the penultimate whorl, while the body whorl lacks an outer cuticle; alternatively, it may be a pale, faintly yellow-tinted white with a brownish apex, and the last two whorls partially covered by an extremely thin cuticle adorned with zigzag olive-brown streaks.

The aperture is pinkish in the first color form and white in the second. The outer lip is narrowly rimmed within. The columellar lamella projects in a triangular shape.

== Distribution ==
This species is endemic to Hawaii, occurring on Molokai Island.
