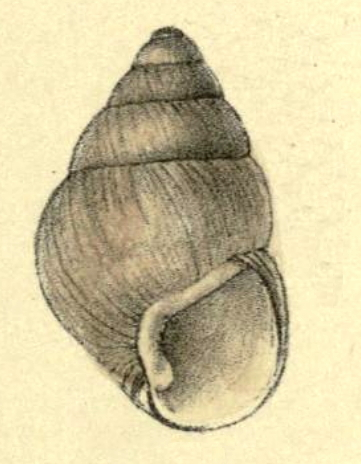
- Shell of Amastra hawaiiensis (holotype)

Scientific classification
- Kingdom: Animalia
- Phylum: Mollusca
- Class: Gastropoda
- Order: Stylommatophora
- Family: Amastridae
- Genus: Amastra
- Species: A. hawaiiensis

Binomial name
- Amastra hawaiiensis Hyatt & Pilsbry, 1911

Synonyms
- Amastra (Amastrella) hawaiiensis Hyatt & Pilsbry, 1911 alternative representation

= Amastra hawaiiensis =

Species of mollusc

Amastra hawaiiensis is a species of air-breathing land snail, a terrestrial pulmonate gastropod mollusc in the family Amastridae.

== Description ==
The length of the shell attains 12 mm, its diameter 7.9 mm.

(Original description) The shell contains 5½ whorls. The shell is imperforate, ovate-conic, thin yet relatively strong, and either white or faintly flesh-tinted beneath a delicate, pale yellowish-brown cuticle. The spire has straight outlines, with embryonic whorls smooth, resembling those of Amastra flavescens.

The subsequent whorl is strongly convex and features fine growth-wrinkle sculpture. The body whorl is inflated and short, sometimes displaying a faint subangular contour at the periphery, particularly in front of the aperture.

The aperture is white, with the outer lip being slightly obtuse but not thickened internally. The columellar fold is moderately pronounced, and the parietal callus is distinct or somewhat thick, with a dirty whitish appearance, adding to the shell's understated elegance.

== Distribution ==
This species is endemic to Hawaii.
