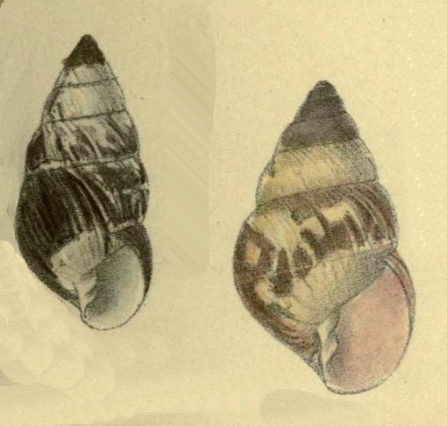
- Shells of Amastra durandi

Scientific classification
- Domain: Eukaryota
- Kingdom: Animalia
- Phylum: Mollusca
- Class: Gastropoda
- Order: Stylommatophora
- Family: Amastridae
- Genus: Amastra
- Species: A. durandi

Binomial name
- Amastra durandi Ancey, 1897

= Amastra durandi =

Species of mollusc

Amastra durandi is a species of air-breathing land snail, a terrestrial pulmonate gastropod mollusc in the family Amastridae.

== Description ==
The length of the shell attains 20 mm, its diameter 9.2 mm

The shell is imperforate or nearly perforate, conoid-oblong, and solid. Its surface is fleshy-white beneath a partly deciduous black-brown epidermis, occasionally marked with lightning-like streaks above. The shell is somewhat glossy and lightly striate, with a bare, blackish-purple apex. The spire is conic-turrite and acute, consisting of 7 whorls. The first whorl is sharply and closely striate, nearly flat, while the subsequent whorls are convex and separated by a narrow, simple suture. The body whorl is oblong and rounded.

The aperture is suboblique, sinuate-semioval, and angular at the top. The parietal wall and columella are glossy reddish, while the remaining interior is uniformly pale rose-white. The columella bears two oblique, sharp, and equal folds near the top. The peristome is acute.

== Distribution ==
This species is endemic to Hawaii, occurring on Oahu island.
