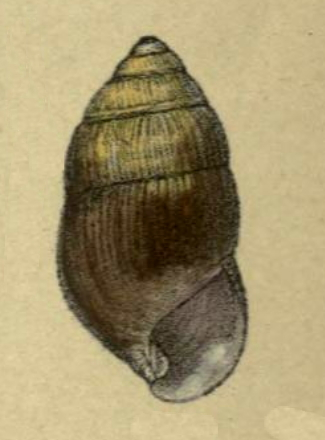
- Shell of Amastra spaldingi (holotype)

Scientific classification
- Kingdom: Animalia
- Phylum: Mollusca
- Class: Gastropoda
- Order: Stylommatophora
- Family: Amastridae
- Genus: Amastra
- Species: A. spaldingi

Binomial name
- Amastra spaldingi C. M. Cooke, 1908

Synonyms
- Amastra (Metamastra) spaldingi E. A. C. M. Cooke, 1908 alternative representation

= Amastra spaldingi =

Species of mollusc

Amastra spaldingi is a species of air-breathing land snail, a terrestrial pulmonate gastropod mollusc in the family Amastridae.

== Description ==
The length of the shell attains 18.9 mm, its diameter 9.6 mm.

The shell is imperforate, dextral, cylindrically ovate, and somewhat thin. It is irregularly and faintly striated with growth lines, with the third whorl distinctly and diagonally striated. The third and fourth whorls feature a distinct spiral thread just above the sutures. The first three whorls are light brown with a yellowish tinge, while the lower three are uniformly dark resinous chestnut.

The spire is subcylindrical with slightly convex outlines and has a somewhat obtuse apex. The suture is simple and barely impressed. There are 6½ whorls, increasing somewhat regularly in size. The whorls of the protoconch are slightly convex, while the rest are flatly convex. The body whorl is cylindrical and tapers gradually towards the base.

The aperture is subpyriform, bluish on the interior, and only slightly oblique. The columella is nearly straight, barely twisted, with a basal columellar fold that is small, thin, oblique, and flexuous. The outer margin of the lip is regularly curved, erect, and thin, forming a slight angle with the base of the columella. The columellar margin is thin, appressed, and adnate.

== Distribution ==
This species is endemic to Hawaii, occurring on Oahu island.
