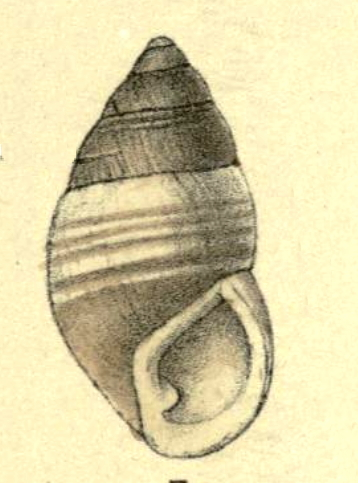
- Shell of † Amastra abavus (holotype)

Scientific classification
- Kingdom: Animalia
- Phylum: Mollusca
- Class: Gastropoda
- Order: Stylommatophora
- Family: Amastridae
- Genus: Amastra
- Species: †A. abavus

Binomial name
- †Amastra abavus Hyatt & Pilsbry, 1911

Synonyms
- † Amastra (Amastrella) abavus Hyatt & Pilsbry, 1911 alternative representation

= Amastra abavus =

Species of mollusc

Amastra abavus is an extinct species of air-breathing land snail, a terrestrial pulmonate gastropod mollusc in the family Amastridae.

== Description ==
The length of the shell attains 11 mm, its diameter 6 mm.

(Original description) The shell contains 5½ whorls. It is imperforate, ovate-conic, exceptionally thick and solid, with a somewhat glossy surface. As a fossil, it lacks a cuticle. The coloration exhibits two variations: (1) the first 2½ whorls are pale brown, followed by a half-whorl with brown bands on a white background, and the final 1½ whorls are opaque white; or (2) a pale brown shell with white bands beginning on the penultimate whorl and dominating the body whorl.

The spire's outlines are slightly convex at the base and straight above, with an obtuse apex. The whorls in the protoconch are convex and very finely striated, with the first whorl being nearly smooth. The subsequent whorls are weakly convex, marked by fine growth lines typical of the species.

The aperture is small, with a faint angularity at the base of the columella. The outer lip is significantly thickened internally, and the columellar margin is robust, supporting a small, nearly horizontal lamella. A thick parietal callus extends to the edge, contributing to the shell's solid and sturdy appearance.

== Distribution ==
This species is endemic to Hawaii and occurs on Molokai Island.
