= Amastra modesta =

Scientific classification
- Kingdom: Animalia
- Phylum: Mollusca
- Class: Gastropoda
- Order: Stylommatophora
- Family: Amastridae
- Genus: Amastra
- Species: A. modesta

Binomial name
- Amastra modesta (C. B. Adams, 1851)

Synonyms
- Achatinella modesta C. B. Adams, 1851 superseded combination; Achatinella pumila L. Pfeiffer, 1879 nomen nudum; Amastra (Amastra) modesta (C. B. Adams, 1851) alternative representation

Species of mollusc

Amastra modesta is a species of air-breathing land snail, a terrestrial pulmonate gastropod mollusc in the family Amastridae.

Subspecies

- Amastra modesta dimissa Hyatt & Pilsbry, 1911
- Amastra modesta modesta (C. B. Adams, 1851)

== Description ==
The length of the shell attains 13.5 mm, is diameter 7.5 mm.

The shell is relatively thick and short, ovate-conic in shape, with a dingy reddish or ash-brown coloration, often partially covered by a dark-brown epidermis. Its surface displays fine, irregular transverse striae, becoming coarser on the upper whorls, and lacks spiral striations.

The apex is subacute, while the spire is short with smoothly curvilinear outlines. Composed of six moderately convex whorls, the shell features a well-defined, deeply impressed suture. The body whorl is notably ventricose.

The aperture is ovate and somewhat acute at the upper end. The outer lip is sharp, unexpanded, and moderately thickened internally. The columellar fold is well developed and distinctly opaque.

== Distribution ==
This species is endemic to Hawaii.
