= Amastra paulula =

Scientific classification
- Kingdom: Animalia
- Phylum: Mollusca
- Class: Gastropoda
- Order: Stylommatophora
- Family: Amastridae
- Genus: Amastra
- Species: A. paulula

Binomial name
- Amastra paulula C. M. Cooke, 1917

Synonyms
- Amastra (Metamastra) paulula C. M. Cooke, 1917 alternative representation

Species of gastropod

Amastra paulula is a species of air-breathing land snail, a terrestrial pulmonate gastropod mollusc in the family Amastridae.

== Description ==
The length of the shell attains 9.8 mm, its diameter 5.4 mm.

(Original description) The shell is perforate, dextral, and ovate, appearing very light brown in its fossilized state. It is relatively thin, with the spire outlined in a convex manner and culminating in an obtuse summit.

The whorls of the protoconch increase rapidly in size. They are convex, and appear smooth, showing no discernible sculpture even under magnification. The subsequent whorls are convex and separated by a very shallow suture, with almost regular fine, thin growth wrinkles adorning their surface. The body whorl is large and rotund.

The aperture is oblique and broad, with a highly convex outer margin accented by a delicate lip rib. The columella is narrowly triangular and slightly oblique, featuring a concave inner margin and an erect, straight outer margin. The columellar fold is strong, nearly transverse, and terminates abruptly near the base of the columella and close to the outer margin.

The umbilicus is distinctly open and cleft-like, adding to the shell's delicate structure.

== Distribution ==
This species is endemic to Hawai, occurring on Oahu Island.
