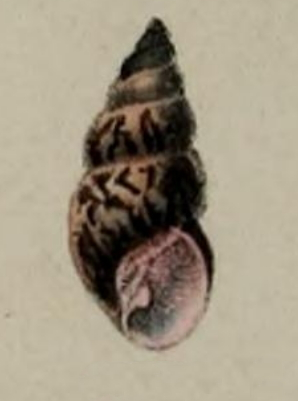
- Shell of Amastra moesta (holotype)

Scientific classification
- Kingdom: Animalia
- Phylum: Mollusca
- Class: Gastropoda
- Order: Stylommatophora
- Family: Amastridae
- Genus: Amastra
- Species: A. moesta

Binomial name
- Amastra moesta (Newcomb, 1854)

Synonyms
- Achatinella moesta Newcomb, 1854 superseded combination; Achatinella obscura Newcomb, 1854 junior subjective synonym; Amastra (Amastra) moesta (Newcomb, 1854) alternative representation

= Amastra moesta =

Species of gastropod

Amastra moesta is a species of land snail, a terrestrial pulmonate gastropod mollusc in the Amastridae family.

== Description ==
(Original description) The shell is dextrorsal and turrito-conical, consisting of seven convex whorls adorned with fine longitudinal striations. The aperture is small, ovate, and slightly contracted. The columella is straight and marked by a prominent white spiral callus at its midpoint.

The shell's coloration is reddish-brown, with the upper whorls appearing black. The middle whorls feature black zigzag lines, while the body whorl is covered by a dark brown epidermis.

== Distribution ==
This marine species is endemic to Hawaii and occurs on Lanai.
