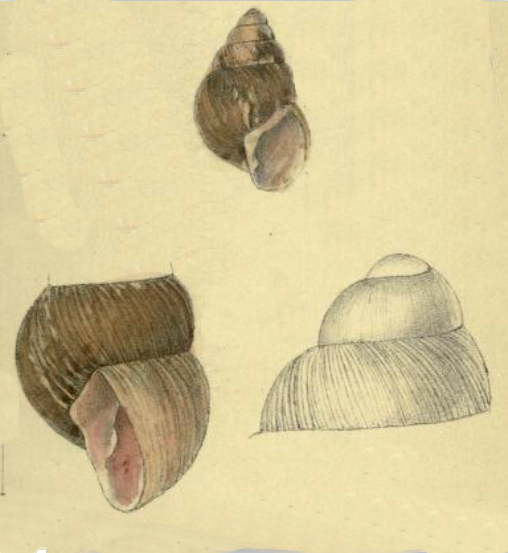
- Shell of Amastra sola (holotype)

Scientific classification
- Kingdom: Animalia
- Phylum: Mollusca
- Class: Gastropoda
- Order: Stylommatophora
- Family: Amastridae
- Genus: Amastra
- Species: A. sola

Binomial name
- Amastra sola Hyatt & Pilsbry, 1911

Synonyms
- Amastra (Cyclamastra) sola Hyatt & Pilsbry, 1911 alternative representation

= Amastra sola =

Species of mollusc

Amastra sola is a species of air-breathing land snail, a terrestrial pulmonate gastropod mollusc in the family Amastridae.

== Description ==
The length of the shell attains 9.8 mm, its diameter 5.3 mm.

(Original description) The shell contains 6 1/2 whorls. The shell is openly perforate, conic, and thin, with minimal luster. The last one or two whorls are a rich dark reddish-brown, accented by lighter lines and patches, while the upper whorls appear pale yellowish, indicative of early cuticle decay.

The spire has straight outlines, though the individual whorls are markedly convex, creating a pronounced contour. The whorls in the protoconch are smooth, transitioning to later whorls that exhibit irregular fine growth-wrinkle sculpture.

The aperture is reddish-brown on the interior, with a very thin, sharp outer lip. The basal margin is well-rounded, while the columellar margin is straight, slightly dilated at the upper end, and arches over the narrow umbilicus. The columellar fold is thin, small, and strongly oblique, adding to the shell's delicate structure.

== Distribution ==
This species is endemic to Hawaii, occurring on Oahu Island.
