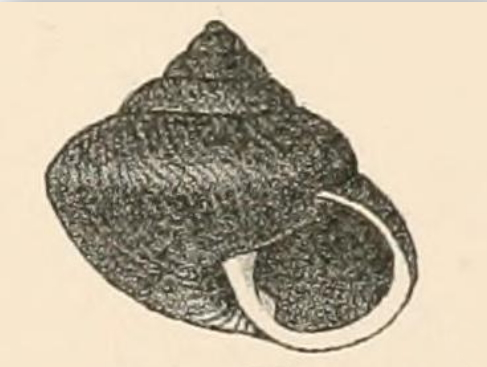
- Shell of Amastra cyclostoma

Scientific classification
- Kingdom: Animalia
- Phylum: Mollusca
- Class: Gastropoda
- Order: Stylommatophora
- Family: Amastridae
- Genus: Amastra
- Species: A. cyclostoma

Binomial name
- Amastra cyclostoma (Baldwin, 1895)

Synonyms
- Achatinella (Amastra) cyclostoma Baldwin, 1895 superseded combination; Amastra (Cyclamastra) cyclostoma (Baldwin, 1895) alternative representation; Cyclamastra cyclostoma (Baldwin, 1895) superseded combination

= Amastra cyclostoma =

Species of mollusc

Amastra cyclostoma is a species of air-breathing land snail, a terrestrial pulmonate gastropod mollusc in the family Amastridae.

Subspecies:

- Amastra cyclostoma cyclostoma (Baldwin, 1895)
- Amastra cyclostoma gregoryi C. M. Cooke, 1933

== Description ==
The length of the shell attains 15 mm, its diameter 18 mm.

(Original description) The shell contains 6 whorls. The shell is dextral, narrowly but deeply perforated, with the perforation extending to the apex. It is somewhat solid, oblately globular in shape, with a short conical spire and an acute apex. The surface is lustreless, sculptured with closely spaced, obliquely descending, flexuous growth lines that become concentric around the umbilicus. The whorls of the protoconch are smooth or exhibit delicate radiating sulcations.

The shell is brown, with a darker tone on the spire. It consists of six whorls, the upper ones relatively flat and rapidly increasing in size. The body whorl is large, dominating the shell, and strongly angled at the periphery. This angularity fades near the aperture, which is slightly deflexed below the carina. The surface above the angle is flat, becoming slightly convex near the aperture, and rounded below the angle. The suture is well-impressed.

The aperture is very oblique, sinuately circular, with a small segment cut off by the penultimate whorl. The interior is livid-white, with the exterior coloration visible through its translucent surface. The peristome is moderately obtuse, slightly thickened within, unreflected, with the extremities slightly converging and joined by a thin callosity. The columella is livid-white, broad, and flat, terminating in a subtle, flexuous plait.

When fully extended in motion, the animal measures approximately 2.41 cm (0.95 inches) in length. The posterior portion of the foot is short and tapers, while the anterior portion is elongated. The head is also elongated, with ocular and labial tentacles set widely apart.

The mantle is dingy white, marked with streaks of black. The foot is very light brown, with its upper surface and sides densely covered in regular, dark brown granulations. The tentacles are long and dark brown.

== Distribution ==
This species is endemic to Hawaii, occurring in very restricted area on Kauai Island.
