= Amastra thurstoni =

Scientific classification
- Kingdom: Animalia
- Phylum: Mollusca
- Class: Gastropoda
- Order: Stylommatophora
- Family: Amastridae
- Genus: Amastra
- Species: A. spicula

Binomial name
- Amastra spicula C. M. Cooke, 1917

Synonyms
- Amastra (Cyclamastra) thurstoni C. M. Cooke, 1917 alternative representation

Species of gastropod

Amastra thurstoni is a species of air-breathing land snail, a terrestrial pulmonate gastropod mollusc in the family Amastridae.

Subspecies

- † Amastra thurstoni bembicodes C. M. Cooke, 1933
- Amastra thurstoni thurstoni C. M. Cooke, 1917

== Description ==
The length of the shell attains 14.4 mm, its diameter 6.3 mm.

(Original description) The shell is narrowly perforate, acuminately turreted, and rather thin. The spire has convex outlines, tapering gradually to a sharp and acute summit.

The surface is marked with strong and nearly regular plications, which are not sharply defined and gradually diminish in prominence towards the apex, terminating abruptly at the second whorl. The shell consists of seven whorls. The embryonic whorls are convex, initially increasing rapidly in size and then more slowly, with a nearly smooth surface that exhibits very faint striations. The fourth whorl is contracted and less convex than the subsequent whorls. The body whorl is elongated, tapering toward the base, and indistinctly angulate at the margin of the perforation.

The umbilicus is narrow, slightly contracted at its opening, and compressed. The aperture is somewhat oblique and subrhomboidal in shape, bearing a thick, blunt callus just within the outer lip. The columella is narrowly triangular, with a basal columellar fold that is oblique and extends nearly to the margin.

== Distribution ==
This rare species is endemic to Hawai, occurring on Oahu Island.
