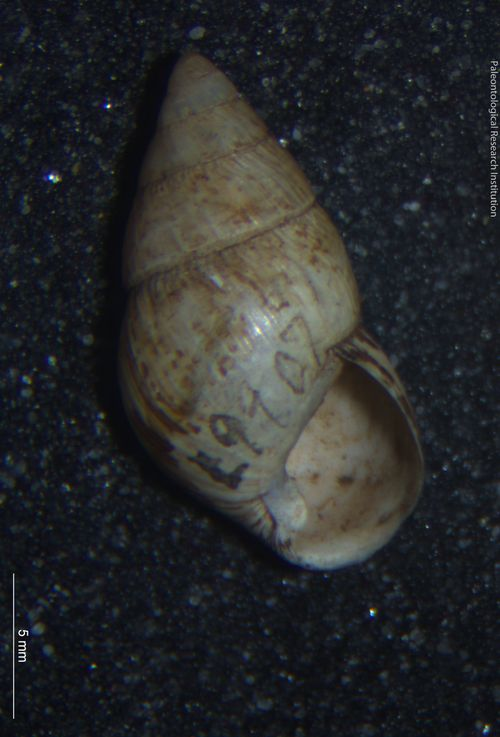
- Shell of Amastra assimilis (specimen at the Paleontological Research Institution)

Scientific classification
- Kingdom: Animalia
- Phylum: Mollusca
- Class: Gastropoda
- Order: Stylommatophora
- Family: Amastridae
- Genus: Amastra
- Species: A. affinis

Binomial name
- Amastra affinis (Newcomb, 1854)

Synonyms
- Achatinella assimilis Newcomb, 1854 superseded combination; Achatinella deshaysii Morelet, 1857 junior subjective synonym; Amastra (Amastra) assimilis (Newcomb, 1854) alternative representation; Amastra affinis var. cinderella Hyatt, 1911 junior subjective synonym; Amastra deshaysii (Morelet, 1857) junior subjective synonym

= Amastra assimilis =

Species of gastropod

Amastra assimilis is a species of land snail, a terrestrial pulmonate gastropod mollusc in the family Amastridae.

== Description ==
(Original description) The shell is conically elongate and sharply acute at the apex, consisting of seven rounded whorls with a well-defined, impressed suture. The aperture is small and ovate, while the columella is very short, plicate, and twisted. The outer lip is acute and slightly thickened internally.

The shell's color varies from white to salmon, with some specimens displaying a white lower half on the body whorl and a salmon upper half. The interior is pure white.

== Distribution ==
This species is endemic to Hawaii and occurs on Maui Island.
