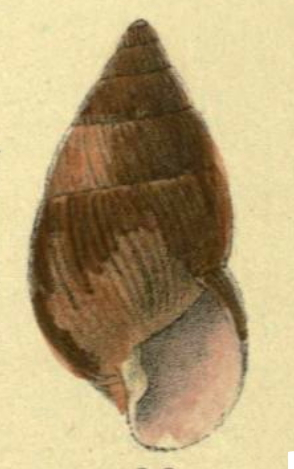
- Shell of Amastra johnsoni (holotype)

Scientific classification
- Kingdom: Animalia
- Phylum: Mollusca
- Class: Gastropoda
- Order: Stylommatophora
- Family: Amastridae
- Genus: Amastra
- Species: A. johnsoni

Binomial name
- Amastra johnsoni Hyatt & Pilsbry, 1911

Synonyms
- Amastra (Amastra) johnsoni Hyatt & Pilsbry, 1911 alternative representation

= Amastra johnsoni =

Species of mollusc

Amastra johnsoni is a species of air-breathing land snail, a terrestrial pulmonate gastropod mollusc in the family Amastridae.

== Description ==
The length of the shell attains 11.3 mm, its diameter 6 mm.

(Original description) The shell contains 6½ whorls. The shell is nearly imperforate, oblong-conic, relatively thin, and somewhat glossy. The spire's outlines are straight in the upper portion and slightly convex near the base, with nearly flat whorls.

The whorls of the protoconch are costate, with the second whorl bearing a keel, resembling those of Amastra affinis. The later whorls are adorned with subtle growth wrinkles. The shell is brown, with the body whorl partially covered by a thin, darker cuticle displaying lighter and darker streaks, though lacking oblique or angular markings.

The aperture is whitish inside, with an acute lip that is only minimally thickened internally. The columella is straight, reflexed at the upper end, and bears a small, strongly oblique lamella, adding a refined detail to the overall structure.

== Distribution ==
This species is endemic to Hawaii, occurring on Maui Island.
