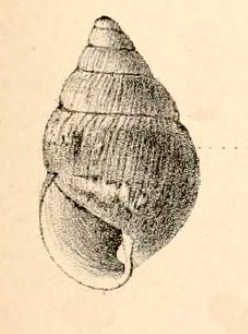
- Shell of Amastra nubigena (holotype)

Scientific classification
- Kingdom: Animalia
- Phylum: Mollusca
- Class: Gastropoda
- Order: Stylommatophora
- Family: Amastridae
- Genus: Amastra
- Species: A. nubigena

Binomial name
- Amastra nubigena Pilsbry & C. M. Cooke, 1914

Synonyms
- Amastra (Heteramastra) nubigena Pilsbry & C. M. Cooke, 1914 alternative representation

= Amastra nubigena =

Species of mollusc

Amastra nubigena is a species of air-breathing land snail, a terrestrial pulmonate gastropod mollusc in the family Amastridae.

== Description ==
The length of the shell attains 10.2 mm, its diameter 5.5 mm.

(Original description) The shell is imperforate, sinistral, solid yet relatively thin, and ovate-turrite in shape. It is dark chocolate-colored with a pale area surrounding the columella. The surface is matte except near the aperture, where the very thin outer cuticle has worn away.

The shell contains 6¼ whorls. The spire has slightly concave outlines near the apex, which is rather acute. The initial half-whorl is smooth, transitioning to the next whorl, which features coarse, arcuate riblets and a keel-like ridge above the suture. Subsequent whorls are more closely and sharply rib-striated. The neanic whorls are keeled, with the carina visible above the suture on some whorls but becoming less distinct on the penultimate whorl. The body whorl is somewhat swollen.

The outer lip displays a white internal thickening, while the columellar lamella is moderately strong and oblique, contributing to the shell's refined structure.

== Distribution ==
This species is endemic to Hawaii and occurs on Maui Island.
