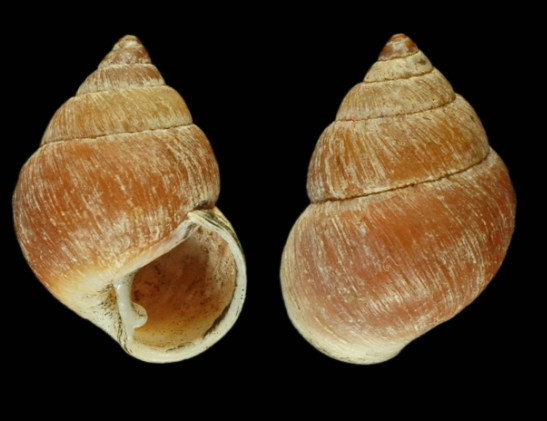
- Shell of Amastra rugulosa (lectotype at MNHN, Paris)

Scientific classification
- Kingdom: Animalia
- Phylum: Mollusca
- Class: Gastropoda
- Order: Stylommatophora
- Family: Amastridae
- Genus: Amastra
- Species: A. rugulosa

Binomial name
- Amastra rugulosa Pease, 1870

Synonyms
- Amastra (Amastra) rugulosa Pease, 1870 alternative representation; Amastra (Amastrella) rugulosa Pease, 1870 · alternative representation; Amastrella rugulosa (Pease, 1870) superseded combination

= Amastra rugulosa =

Species of mollusc

Amastra rugulosa is a species of air-breathing land snail, a terrestrial pulmonate gastropod mollusc in the family Amastridae.

Subspecies

- † Amastra rugulosa annosa C. M. Cooke, 1917
- Amastra rugulosa fastigata C. M. Cooke, 1917
- Amastra rugulosa janeae C. M. Cooke, 1933
- Amastra rugulosa normalis Hyatt & Pilsbry, 1911
- Amastra rugulosa rugulosa Pease, 1870

Variety

- Amastra rugulosa var. similaris Pease, 1870: synonym of Amastra similaris Pease, 1870 ( superseded rank)

== Description ==
The length of the shell attains 12 mm, its diameter 9 mm

The shell is ovate-conic, thick, and rimate, with obliquely wrinkled striations. It is covered by a rough brown epidermis, beneath which lies a chestnut-colored surface. The lip edge and the area around the base are whitish, while the apex is blackish.

The shell is composed of six convex whorls, which are occasionally slightly inflated. The suture is distinctly impressed. The aperture is ovate and vertically oriented. The columellar fold is robust, callous, compressed, and nearly transverse. The lip is thickened, adding to the shell's overall solid structure.

This species is significantly more roughly sculptured than Amastra nucleola, with a more obese form, more convex whorls, and a stronger columellar lamella. It closely resembles Amastra sphaerica in texture and color but differs by having a longer shell, a smaller umbilicus, and a distinct white basal area that is absent in A. sphaerica.

The spire's outlines, while nearly straight, show a subtle convexity in the lower part and concavity near the apex. The early sculpture is similar to that described for Amastra nucleola. The species has 5½ to 5¾ whorls, the initial ones being brown or purplish-brown (contrary to Pease's description of them as blackish). The body whorl is marked by rough, uneven striations without spiral lines. It features a white area at the base and a narrow whitish streak behind the lip.

The aperture is brown on the interior, with a narrow white rim within the obtuse lip. The columellar fold is pronounced. An axial perforation is present, partially closed by the columellar lip.

== Distribution ==
This species is endemic to Hawaii, occurring on Kauai island.
