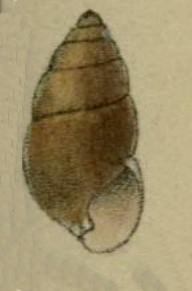
- Shell of Amastra rubida

Scientific classification
- Kingdom: Animalia
- Phylum: Mollusca
- Class: Gastropoda
- Order: Stylommatophora
- Family: Amastridae
- Genus: Amastra
- Species: A. rubida

Binomial name
- Amastra rubida Gulick, 1873

Synonyms
- Amastra (Amastrella) rubida E. A. C. M. Cooke, 1908 alternative representation

= Amastra rubida =

Species of mollusc

Amastra rubida is a species of air-breathing land snail, a terrestrial pulmonate gastropod mollusc in the family Amastridae.

== Description ==
The length of the shell attains 18 mm, its diameter 9 mm

The shell is dextral, elongate-ovate and finely striated with growth lines. It is colored with a pale reddish-chestnut, though occasionally covered with a blackish epidermis. The shell contains 6, slightly convex whorls, with the first two smooth and brown. The suture is simple and well-defined. The aperture is small and exhibits a subtle purple hue within. The peristome is thin and delicate, while the columellar fold is very fine and faintly developed.

This species closely approaches Amastra rubens in certain varieties exhibiting a reddish-brown middle layer, but its periostracum is thinner and less persistent. In fact, the shell lacks a well-developed periostracum except along the suture and displays a more uniform pinkish tone overall. The aperture in most specimens is pink or purple internally, distinguishing it further.

Gulick noted its affinities with Amastra decorticata, yet the shell's thicker, opaque nature and the more transient periostracum suggest it aligns more closely with the Amastra tristis series. Gulick identified a transitional set of five shells he considered intermediate between A. decorticata and this species. Of these, one is a true A. decorticata with its characteristic intact periostracum and acute apex, while the remaining four exhibit the typical coloration and periostracum of this species but possess blunter apices, shorter, stouter spires, and lighter-colored apertures. These shells may represent hybrids—potentially termed rubida-elliptica.

== Distribution ==
This species is endemic to Hawaii, occurring on Oahu island.
