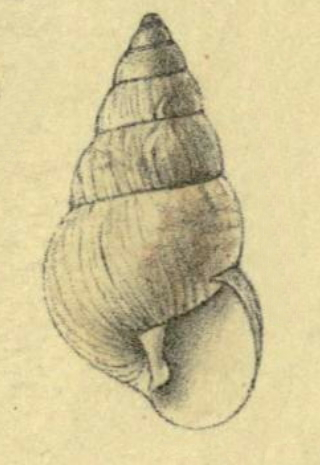
- Shell of Amastra fossilis

Scientific classification
- Kingdom: Animalia
- Phylum: Mollusca
- Class: Gastropoda
- Order: Stylommatophora
- Family: Amastridae
- Genus: Amastra
- Species: A. fossilis

Binomial name
- Amastra fossilis Baldwin, 1903

Synonyms
- Amastra (Amastrella) fossilis Baldwin, 1903 alternative representation

= Amastra fossilis =

Species of mollusc

Amastra fossilis is a species of air-breathing land snail, a terrestrial pulmonate gastropod mollusc in the family Amastridae.

== Description ==
The length of the shell attains 18 mm, its diameter 9 mm

The species was originally described as a fossil. The shell is dextral, and minutely perforated, with a somewhat solid structure and an elongately conical form. The apex is relatively acute, and the surface is adorned with somewhat irregular growth lines. Under magnification, the whorls of the protoconch exhibit very delicate and regular sulcations. The original color of the living shell remains unknown.

The shell comprises 7 whorls, which are slightly convex. The aperture is oblique and ovate, with a simple and very thin peristome. The columellar margin is slightly expanded, partially covering the umbilicus. The columella terminates in a slender, flexuous, thread-like plait, adding a distinctive feature to the structure.

The shell differs from Amastra conica by being broader at the base and more turrited, closely resembling certain wider forms of Amastra turritella in overall contour. Additionally, some specimens exhibit a slightly malleated texture.

The whorls of the protoconch are worn, rendering their original sculpture indiscernible. The later whorls are moderately convex, marked with rather coarse growth wrinkles. In larger shells, the body whorl may show areas of irregular malleation. The columellar fold is small, oblique, and subtle, while the axial perforation is relatively large and open, contributing to the distinctiveness of the shell.

== Distribution ==
This species is endemic to Hawaii, occurring on the Mauna Kea volcano.
