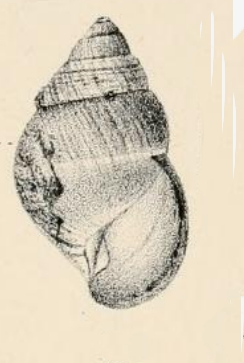
- Shell of Amastra kalamaulensis (holotype)

Scientific classification
- Kingdom: Animalia
- Phylum: Mollusca
- Class: Gastropoda
- Order: Stylommatophora
- Family: Amastridae
- Genus: Amastra
- Species: A. kalamaulensis

Binomial name
- Amastra kalamaulensis Pilsbry & C. M. Cooke, 1914

Synonyms
- Amastra (Amastra) kalamaulensis Pilsbry & C. M. Cooke, 1914 · alternative representation

= Amastra kalamaulensis =

Species of mollusc

Amastra kalamaulensis is a species of air-breathing land snail, a terrestrial pulmonate gastropod mollusc in the family Amastridae.

== Description ==
The length of the shell attains 11.9 mm, its diameter 7 mm.

(Original description) The shell is imperforate or nearly so, ovate-conic, and very thin. It has a glossy light brownish-olive coloration near the aperture. Elsewhere, it is covered by a thin russet cuticle, often marked with darker or blackish streaks on the body whorl. The last half of the shell is frequently entirely black, typically displaying a cream-white band at the periphery that extends a short distance in front of the aperture.

The shell contains 5 1/3 whorls. The embryonic whorls are flat, carinate, and costate, with ribs coarser than those of Amastra mucronata. The subsequent whorls are somewhat convex, characterized by irregular growth lines. The acutely angular periphery remains distinct on the penultimate whorl but becomes rounded before reaching the last, where the former position of the keel is usually indicated by a light band on the ventral side.

The aperture is dark inside, lacking any white lining. The columellar fold is thin, and the columellar margin is reflected, nearly or entirely closing the perforation.

== Distribution ==
This species is endemic to Hawaii and occurs on Molokai Island.
