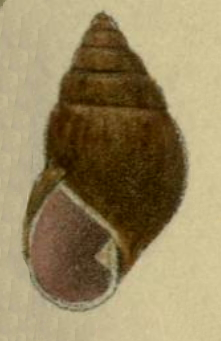
- Shell of Amastra fraterna

Scientific classification
- Kingdom: Animalia
- Phylum: Mollusca
- Class: Gastropoda
- Order: Stylommatophora
- Family: Amastridae
- Genus: Amastra
- Species: A. fraterna

Binomial name
- Amastra fraterna Sykes, 1896

Synonyms
- Amastra (Heteramastra) fraterna Sykes, 1896 · alternative representation

= Amastra fraterna =

Species of mollusc

Amastra fraterna is a species of air-breathing land snail, a terrestrial pulmonate gastropod mollusc in the family Amastridae.

== Description ==
The length of the shell attains 10 mm, its diameter 5.5 mm

The shell is sinistral, ovate-turriform, and thin, with an impressed suture. It consists of 6 1/5 to 7 whorls, which are slightly convex and longitudinally striated. The surface is covered with a brown to blackish-corneous epidermis, lending a natural and earthy appearance.

The aperture is ovate and of moderate size, with an unexpanded and acute peristome. A moderate lamina enhances the columella, contributing to the shell's structural elegance.

The shell is notably more inflated compared to any member of the Amastra soror group from Maui. It is entirely covered with a thin, dark-brown to black cuticle, which is often worn away near the front of the aperture, revealing the underlying purple-brown coloration.

The typical form features a nearly straight-sided spire and consists of 6½ to 7 whorls. A variant form, however, has fewer whorls and a spire with concave sides.

The whorls of the protoconch are adorned with exquisitely fine ribbing, the costellate riblets being narrow and sharply defined. The whorls are uniformly convex, with the body whorl appearing notably inflated. The outlines of the spire in this form are distinctly concave. The columellar lamella is relatively small externally but becomes more prominent deeper within the aperture, contributing to the characteristic structure of the shell.

== Distribution ==
This species is endemic to Hawaii, occurring on Lanai island.
