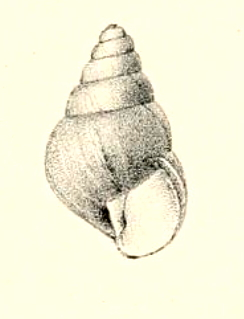
- Shell of Amastra ultima (holotype)

Scientific classification
- Kingdom: Animalia
- Phylum: Mollusca
- Class: Gastropoda
- Order: Stylommatophora
- Family: Amastridae
- Genus: Amastra
- Species: A. ultima

Binomial name
- Amastra ultima Pilsbry & C. M. Cooke, 1914

Synonyms
- Amastra (Cyclamastra) ultima Pilsbry & C. M. Cooke, 1914 alternative representation

= Amastra ultima =

Species of mollusc

Amastra ultima is a species of air-breathing land snail, a terrestrial pulmonate gastropod mollusc in the family Amastridae.

== Description ==
The length of the shell attains 10 mm, its diameter 6.1 mm.

(Original description) The shell resembles Amastra morticina in overall shape but differs by featuring a significantly larger umbilicus and a much weaker columellar lamella.

The shell contains six whorls. The spire is straightly conic, with all whorls convex. The embryonic whorls are smooth, while the remaining whorls exhibit faint, uneven, and irregular growth striae.

The coloration ranges from russet to mars brown. The body whorl is slightly compressed around the umbilicus, which contains a spiral sulcus positioned opposite the columellar lamella.

The aperture is relatively narrow and angular at both ends, with an interior coloration matching the exterior. The outer lip is thin, and the columella is vertical, bearing a very low, oblique lamella that does not extend to the edge, adding a subtle refinement to the shell's structure.

== Distribution ==
This species is endemic to Hawaii and occurs on Honolulu Island.
