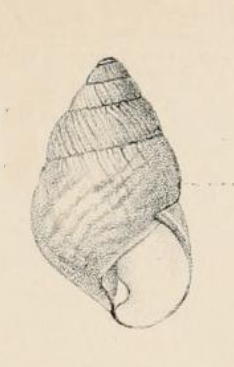
- Shell of Amastra lahainana (holotype)

Scientific classification
- Kingdom: Animalia
- Phylum: Mollusca
- Class: Gastropoda
- Order: Stylommatophora
- Family: Amastridae
- Genus: Amastra
- Species: A. lahainana

Binomial name
- Amastra lahainana Pilsbry & C. M. Cooke, 1914

Synonyms
- Amastra (Amastra) lahainana Pilsbry & C. M. Cooke, 1914 · alternative representation

= Amastra lahainana =

Species of mollusc

Amastra lahainana is a species of air-breathing land snail, a terrestrial pulmonate gastropod mollusc in the family Amastridae.

== Description ==
The length of the shell attains 11 mm, its diameter 6 mm.

(Original description) The shell is perforate or closed, ovate-conic, thin but relatively robust, with a matte surface. It features coarse growth striae near the suture, which are weaker elsewhere. The coloration is highly variable, ranging from carob brown, russet, apricot buff, and ochraceous buff to nearly white. Occasionally, the shell exhibits a bipartite color pattern, such as a light upper portion with a dark base or a light base with a dark spire; more rarely, it is dark with a light base. In some cases, a thin, fragmentary outer cuticle may be present, ivory-yellow with zigzag or net-like markings in mummy brown.

The shell contains 5½ whorls. The embryonic whorls are more convex and finely costulate than in Amastra affinis, with the embryonic shell displaying colors such as chestnut brown, pinkish buff, or cream, often marked with oblique corneous streaks on the last half whorl. The aperture closely resembles that of A. affinis, with the outer lip only slightly thickened internally. The columellar fold is strong and prominent.

== Distribution ==
This species is endemic to Hawaii and occurs on Maui Island.
