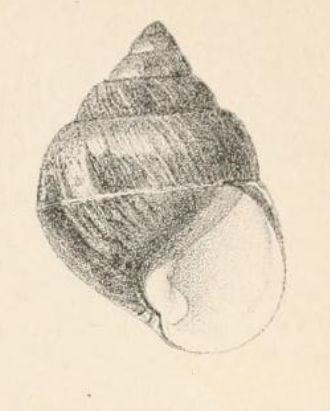
- Shell of Amastra goniops (holotype)

Scientific classification
- Kingdom: Animalia
- Phylum: Mollusca
- Class: Gastropoda
- Order: Stylommatophora
- Family: Amastridae
- Genus: Amastra
- Species: A. goniops

Binomial name
- Amastra goniops Pilsbry & C. M. Cooke, 1914

Synonyms
- Amastra (Amastra) goniops Pilsbry & C. M. Cooke, 1914 · alternative representation

= Amastra goniops =

Species of mollusc

Amastra goniops is a species of air-breathing land snail, a terrestrial pulmonate gastropod mollusc in the family Amastridae.

== Description ==
The length of the shell attains 11.2 mm, its diameter 7.5 mm.

(Original description) The shell is imperforate or narrowly perforate, solid, and bi-conic. It has a Vandyke brown coloration that often fades to a lighter pecan brown on the denuded surface near the aperture. The surface is rather dull, with light growth wrinkles and occasional spiral striations above the periphery. The periphery is sharply angular or carinate near the front, gradually rounding in the last half or less of the shell. The spire is convex in its lower portion and slightly concave in the upper part.

The shell contains 5½ whorls; The embryonic whorls are finely and sharply striate, with the embryonic shell angular at the periphery, resembling that of Amastra obesa. The aperture is noticeably oblique, with an interior that is white or delicately tinted in pale blue, pink, or violet shades. The lip-rib is strong and nearly white. The columella is short and features a prominent, slightly oblique fold.

== Distribution ==
This species is endemic to Hawaii and occurs on Maui Island.
