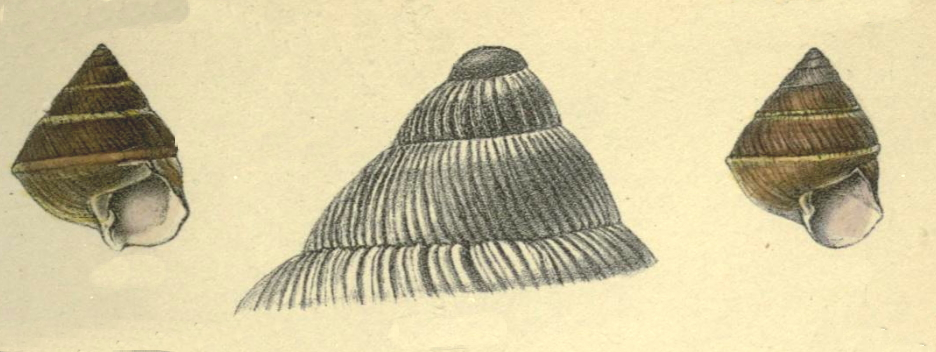
- Shell of Amastra kauaiensis

Scientific classification
- Kingdom: Animalia
- Phylum: Mollusca
- Class: Gastropoda
- Order: Stylommatophora
- Family: Amastridae
- Genus: Amastra
- Species: A. kauaiensis

Binomial name
- Amastra kauaiensis (Newcomb, 1860)

Synonyms
- Achatinella kauaiensis Newcomb, 1860 superseded combination; Amastra (Kauaia) kauaiensis (Newcomb, 1860) alternative representation; Kauaia kauaiensis (Newcomb, 1860) superseded combination

= Amastra kauaiensis =

Species of mollusc

Amastra kauaiensis is a species of air-breathing land snail, a terrestrial pulmonate gastropod mollusc in the family Amastridae.

== Description ==
The length of the shell attains 23.5 mm, its diameter 19 mm

The shell is imperforate, dextral, and trochiform in shape, solid and carinate. The first whorl is smooth (though worn in the examples observed). The second whorl is coarsely and arcuately ribbed, while the third whorl features finer ribs. The subsequent whorls are characterized by irregular, oblique wrinkle-striations. On the fourth whorl, spiral sculpture begins to emerge, initially fine but later becoming rather coarse, forming low spiral cords.

The whorls are strongly keeled, with the keel positioned above the suture on the last two or three whorls, or concealed on all but the body whorl, where it becomes more prominent. The base is convex, and the whorls are 6½ in number, with only a slight convexity. The color is a dull red-brown, deepening to purplish-brown at the apex and lightening to a yellowish hue at the base. A whitish border runs beneath the suture across all whorls. The aperture is oblique and white within. The outer lip is thickened, and the columella bears a strong spiral fold beneath the middle.

The cuticle is thin, with a light brownish tint, while the darker hue is found within the substance of the underlying shell. The embryonic shell is angular at the periphery and measures 7.5 mm in length.

In some specimens, there is a faint suggestion of a carina at the shoulder, particularly on the later part of the body whorl. This feature, which appears only sporadically, seems to connect to Amastra knudsenii, where a stout ridge develops in the same position.

Two distinct types of apex are observed. One is more pointed, with smoother, shinier horn-colored surfaces due to finer growth striations, and the dorsal outer sides are subtly rounded, possibly even featuring a slight shoulder on the first whorl in some specimens. The striae are not strictly parallel and may be somewhat irregular. The other type has more regular fold-like longitudinal growth bands from an early stage, with flatter dorsals in subsequent whorls.

The axis of the shell is tubular, with a notable contraction near each whorl's lower partition and a widening near the upper partition's connection. Thus, an umbilical orifice exists behind the reflexed columellar lip until the shell nears maturity, at which point it closes. In the last half-whorl, a callous lamella is superimposed just above the axis's basal contraction.

The shell remains angular at the periphery throughout post-embryonic growth. By the third or fourth whorl, a projecting peripheral keel forms, persisting to the aperture and strengthening with age. In adults, the aperture narrows significantly, especially in comparison to younger shells with fewer whorls. As the shell matures further, the body whorl drops below the keel, eventually narrowing laterally—a feature that appears earlier in some shells than in others.

The animal is quite small in relation to its shell, measuring slightly larger than the shell's diameter, but it is exceedingly narrow. The heavy shell is carried balanced on its back, and when crawling, the animal stretches its head as far forward as possible, fixing both ends of its body while the middle part contracts, thereby pulling the shell along.

== Distribution ==
This species is endemic to Hawaii, occurring on Kauai island.
