= Tropidoptera heliciformis =

Conservation status
- Critically Endangered (IUCN 2.3)

- Critically Imperiled (NatureServe)

Scientific classification
- Kingdom: Animalia
- Phylum: Mollusca
- Class: Gastropoda
- Order: Stylommatophora
- Family: Amastridae
- Genus: Tropidoptera
- Species: T. heliciformis

Binomial name
- Tropidoptera heliciformis Ancey, 1890

Synonyms
- Amastra heliciformis Ancey, 1890 superseded combination

Species of gastropod

Tropidoptera heliciformis is a species of small, air-breathing land snail, a terrestrial pulmonate gastropod mollusk in the family Amastridae.

== Description ==
The length of the shell attains 6 mm, its diameter 10 mm.

(Original description in Latin) The shell is heliciform, depressed, and broadly umbilicate, with the umbilicus open, deep, angular at the margin, and approximately 2 mm in width. The surface is matte, brown, and marked with coarse striations, giving it a somewhat solid appearance.

The spire is depressed and broadly conical with a somewhat obtuse apex. It consists of 5 slightly convex whorls that increase regularly in size and are separated by an impressed suture. The body whorl is carinate, sloping convexly above, fully convex below, and gradually descending over a distance in front.

The aperture is oblique, irregularly circular, and furnished with a sharp, revolving, simple columellar fold. It is emarginate and angular externally, rounding at the base. The margins of the aperture are remote, with the columellar margin straight-sloping and forming an angle with the basal margin.

== Distribution ==
This species is endemic to Hawaii, occurring on Oahu.
