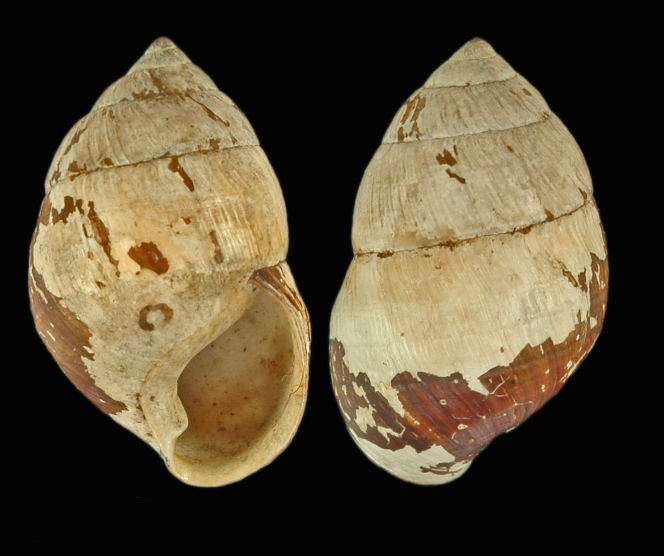
- Shell of Amastra tristis (specimen at MNHN, Paris)

Scientific classification
- Kingdom: Animalia
- Phylum: Mollusca
- Class: Gastropoda
- Order: Stylommatophora
- Family: Amastridae
- Genus: Amastra
- Species: A. tristis

Binomial name
- Amastra tristis (Quoy & Gaimard, 1825)
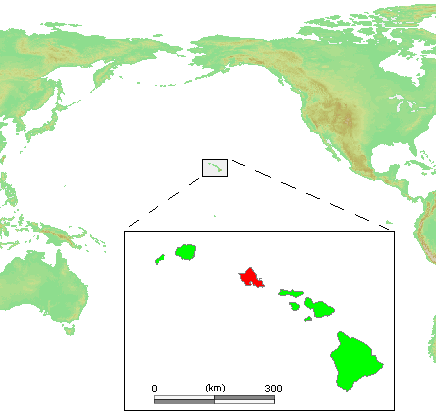
- Location of Oʻahu

Synonyms
- Achatinella fuliginosa A. Gould, 1845 junior subjective synonym; Amastra (Amastrella) tristis (Quoy & Gaimard, 1825) alternative representation; Helix tristis Quoy & Gaimard, 1825 superseded combination

= Amastra tristis =

Species of gastropod

Amastra tristis is a species of air-breathing land snail, a terrestrial pulmonate gastropod mollusc in the family Amastridae.

== Description ==
The length of the shell can reach 18 mm, its diameter 11 mm

The shell is imperforate or slightly rimate, oblong-conic, and moderately solid. The coloration transitions from blackish-purple on the initial 2–3 whorls to reddish-brown with a pale sutural margin, ultimately fading to light reddish-brown or nearly white on the final whorl. The last 2–3 whorls are coated with a thin, dark brown cuticle, which is often shed in angular fragments or patches and is typically absent near the aperture.

The spire is slightly convexly conic and tapers to an acute apex, comprising 5½–5¾ nearly flat whorls. The first whorl is almost smooth, with the second adorned by regular radial ripples. Subsequent whorls exhibit fine growth striae, while the last two whorls display coarse growth wrinkles and fine spiral striae. The body whorl often features several irregularly spaced spiral grooves.

The aperture is ovate and slightly oblique, lined with a distinct internal rib within the peristome. The columella is short and moderately expanded, bearing a pronounced, spiral lamella. A thin, transparent parietal callus subtly overlays the inner surface. The shell's axis is slender and sinuous, widening slightly with each whorl, and the lamella penetrates nearly a full whorl into the structure.

The shape of the embryonic whorls and the maculation of the neanic whorls in many individuals resemble those of Amastra badia. The incised spiral striae are also characteristic of Amastra undata, Amastra transversalis, and others in the group to which A. badia belongs. This suggests that A. tristis represents a somewhat generalized or synthetic species within this assemblage.

== Distribution ==
This species is endemic to Hawai, occurring on Oʻahu.
