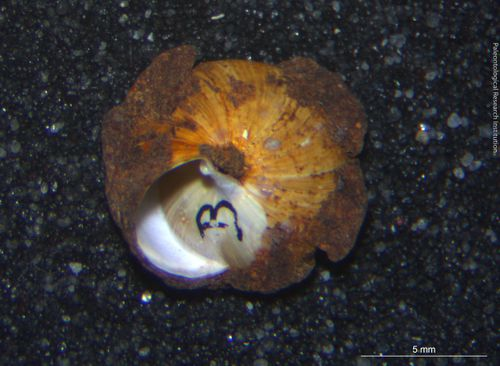
- Shell of Amastra agglutinans (specimen at the Paleontological Research Institution)

Scientific classification
- Kingdom: Animalia
- Phylum: Mollusca
- Class: Gastropoda
- Order: Stylommatophora
- Family: Amastridae
- Genus: Amastra
- Species: A. agglutinans

Binomial name
- Amastra agglutinans (Newcomb, 1854)

Synonyms
- Achatinella obesa agglutinans Newcomb, 1854 superseded rank; Achatinella obesa var. agglutinans Newcomb, 1854 superseded combination; Amastra (Cyclamastra) agglutinans (Newcomb, 1854) alternative representation; Amastra carinata Gulick, 1873 junior subjective synonym

= Amastra agglutinans =

Species of gastropod

Amastra agglutinans is a species of land snail, a terrestrial pulmonate gastropod mollusc in the family Amastridae.

== Description ==
(Original description) This shell looks much like Amastra obesa. The shell is slightly carinated on the last two whorls, with the keel accentuated by agglutinations, creating a distinctive pagoda-like appearance.

== Distribution ==
This species is endemic to Hawaii and occurs on Haleakalā.
