= Armsia petasus =

Conservation status
- Critically Endangered (IUCN 2.3)

- Critically Imperiled (NatureServe)

Scientific classification
- Kingdom: Animalia
- Phylum: Mollusca
- Class: Gastropoda
- Order: Stylommatophora
- Family: Amastridae
- Genus: Armsia
- Species: A. petasus

Binomial name
- Armsia petasus (Ancey, 1899)

Species of gastropod

Armsia petasus is a species of small, air-breathing, land snail, a terrestrial pulmonate gastropod mollusk in the family Amastridae. They are critically endangered by habitat loss. This species is endemic to the United States.
