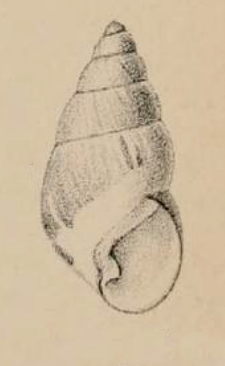
- Shell of Amastra neglecta (holotype)

Scientific classification
- Kingdom: Animalia
- Phylum: Mollusca
- Class: Gastropoda
- Order: Stylommatophora
- Family: Amastridae
- Genus: Amastra
- Species: A. neglecta

Binomial name
- Amastra neglecta Pilsbry & C. M. Cooke, 1914

Synonyms
- Amastra (Amastra) neglecta Pilsbry & C. M. Cooke, 1914 · alternative representation

= Amastra neglecta =

Species of mollusc

Amastra neglecta is a species of air-breathing land snail, a terrestrial pulmonate gastropod mollusc in the family Amastridae.

== Description ==
The length of the shell attains 12 mm, its diameter 6.7 mm.

(Original description) The shell is imperforate, similar to Amastra affinis, but exhibit a more broadly and uniformly conic shape. The cuticle is a tawny-olive color, free of any dark variegation. The aperture is wider, and the columellar fold is noticeably stronger, ascending with a gentler slope compared to A. affinis.

The shell contains six whorls. The apical whorls are brown, while areas in front of the aperture where the cuticle is eroded reveal a bluish-white surface.

It is distinguished from A. affinis by its straightly conic spire, which tapers more narrowly towards the apex, the more pronounced and less steeply ascending columellar fold, and the absence of any variegated markings.

== Distribution ==
This species is endemic to Hawaii and occurs on Maui Island.
