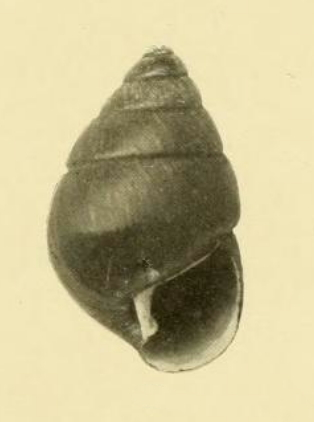
- Shell of Amastra montivaga (holotype)

Scientific classification
- Kingdom: Animalia
- Phylum: Mollusca
- Class: Gastropoda
- Order: Stylommatophora
- Family: Amastridae
- Genus: Amastra
- Species: A. montivaga

Binomial name
- Amastra montivaga C. M. Cooke, 1917

Synonyms
- Amastra (Metamastra) montivaga C. M. Cooke, 1917 alternative representation

= Amastra montivaga =

Species of gastropod

Amastra montivaga is a species of air-breathing land snail, a terrestrial pulmonate gastropod mollusc in the family Amastridae.

== Description ==
The length of the shell attains 13.2 mm, its diameter 7.3 mm.

(Original description) The shell is perforate or imperforate, dextral, thin, and nearly smooth, with faint striations from growth wrinkles. Just below the sutures, there is a shallow sulcus, transversely interrupted by numerous strong, slightly backward-bent striae. The shell's color is chestnut, accented by a yellowish zone around the columella.

The whorls of the protoconch are convex, faintly, and irregularly striated with growth wrinkles. The subsequent whorls are slightly convex, featuring a distinct shoulder just above the sutures. The body whorl is indistinctly angulate just above the periphery.

The aperture is slightly oblique, with an outer margin that is slightly flattened above and curved below. The margin is edged in black, equipped with a very thin lip rib, and forms a broad sinus with the base of the columella. The columella is short and narrow, with a straight upper outer margin that angles just outside the columellar fold.

The columellar fold is basal, thin, and not particularly strong, tapering gradually near the columellar margin. When present, the umbilicus is minute and cleft-like.

== Distribution ==
This species is endemic to Hawai, occurring on Oahu Island.
