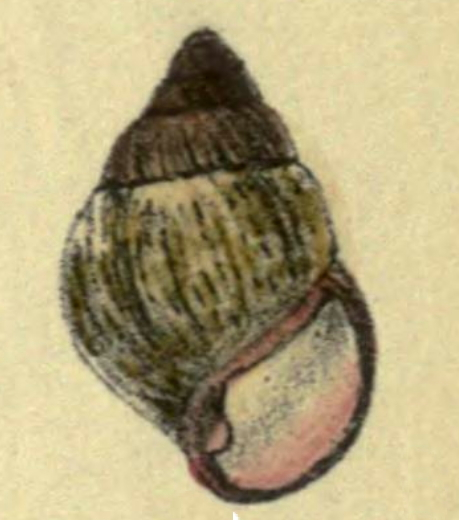
- Shell of Amastra porphyrostoma

Scientific classification
- Kingdom: Animalia
- Phylum: Mollusca
- Class: Gastropoda
- Order: Stylommatophora
- Family: Amastridae
- Genus: Amastra
- Species: A. porphyrostoma

Binomial name
- Amastra porphyrostoma (Pease, 1869)

Synonyms
- Amastra (Paramastra) porphyrostoma (Pease, 1869) · alternative representation; Helicter (Amastra) porphyrostoma Pease, 1869 superseded combination

= Amastra porphyrostoma =

Species of mollusc

Amastra porphyrostoma is a species of air-breathing land snail, a terrestrial pulmonate gastropod mollusc in the family Amastridae.

== Description ==
The length of the shell attains 20 mm, its diameter 11 mm

The shell is dextral, imperforate, thick, and long-conic, with fine rough striae. It is covered by a notably thick, rough, brown epidermis, under which lies a thinner, smooth, brown layer. The spire is convexly conic, composed of six convex whorls. The body whorl is convex and accounts for half the total shell length. The suture is distinct and well defined.

The aperture is subelliptical, slightly angular at the base. The columella is narrow and vertical, bearing a thick, lamelliform, nearly transverse fold. The outer margin is simple. Beneath the epidermis, the shell's ground color is a yellowish tone. The columella and outer lip display a subtle purple hue, while the shell's summit is a reddish brown.

== Distribution ==
This species is endemic to Hawaii, occurring on Oahu island.
