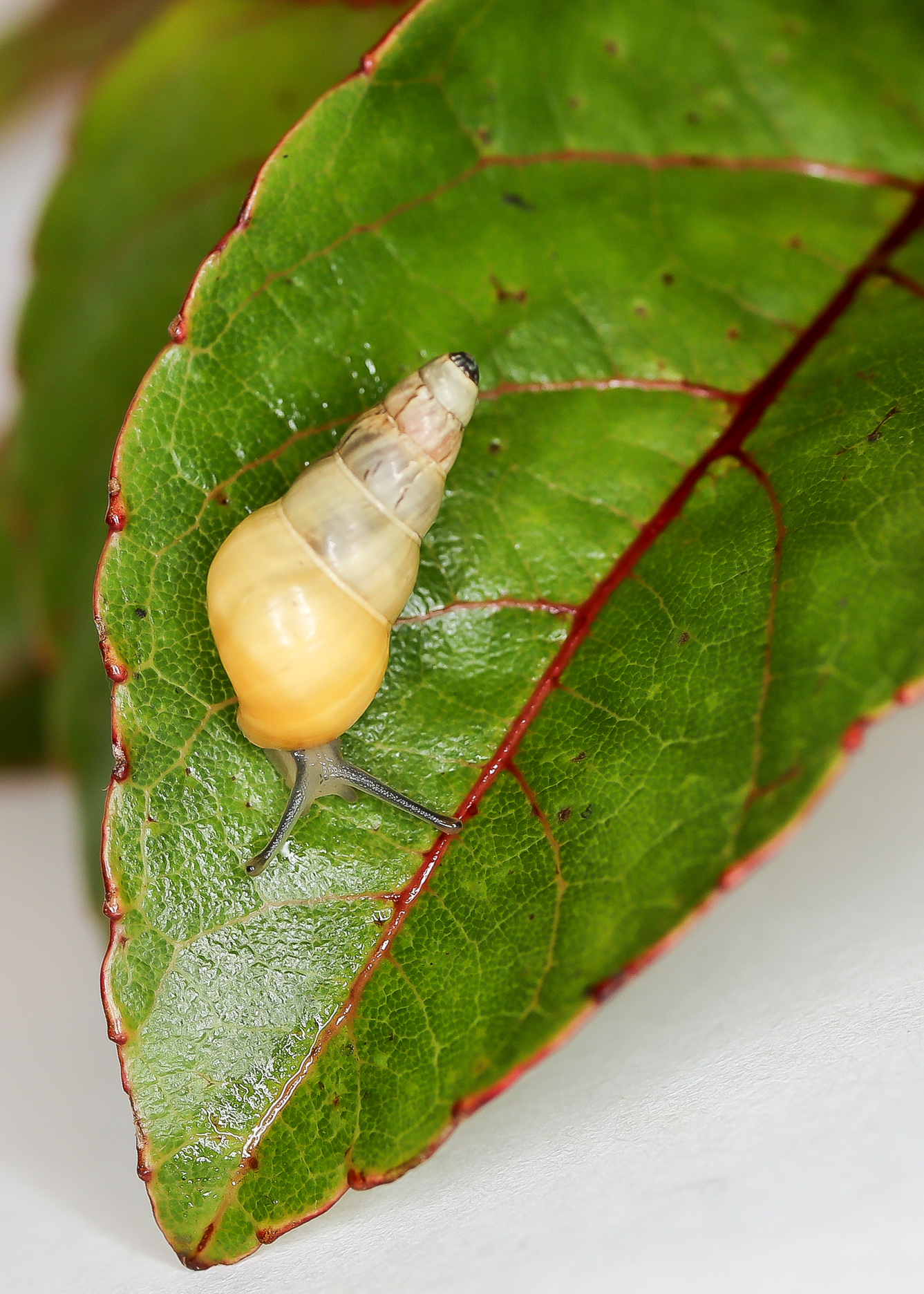

Scientific classification
- Kingdom: Animalia
- Phylum: Mollusca
- Class: Gastropoda
- Order: Stylommatophora
- Superfamily: Pupilloidea
- Family: Amastridae
- Genus: Laminella
- Species: L. venusta

Binomial name
- Laminella venusta (Mighels, 1845)

Synonyms
- Achatinella (Newcombia) venusta Mighels, 1845 (unaccepted combination); Achatinella venusta Mighels, 1845 (original combination)

= Laminella venusta =

Graceful Laminella

Species of gastropod

Laminella venusta is a species of land snail in the genus Laminella. Laminella venusta is a land snail in the family Amastridae. In 1845 this species was given the common name of graceful Laminella snail. The Hawaiian name for Laminella venusta is Pupu Kuahiwi, and it is the only surviving member of its family currently living on the island of Molokai.

Subspecies:

- Laminella venusta muscaria Hyatt & Pilsbry, 1911
- Laminella venusta orientalis Hyatt & Pilsbry, 1911
- Laminella venusta venusta (Mighels, 1845)

== Description ==
Laminella venusta is described as having a fawn-colored body with small distinct black points down its sides. It also has extremely dark tentacles. This species has a lean body that can increase to a size of two-thirds longer than its shell. The size of its shell can approximately reach to 1.35 cm in height with a diameter of 0.62 to 0.73 cm. The Graceful Laminella Snail is distinguished by the final whorl and the sunken black markings on its shell.

== Distribution and habitat ==
It is endemic to Hawaii. Laminella venusta makes its home in the Mapulehu Valley near Molokai’s southeastern coast. This rare species can be found on olopua trees down in gulches. This species routinely swabs fungi off olona leaves, as fungi are its main food source. The species is one of the nine state snails of Hawaii.
