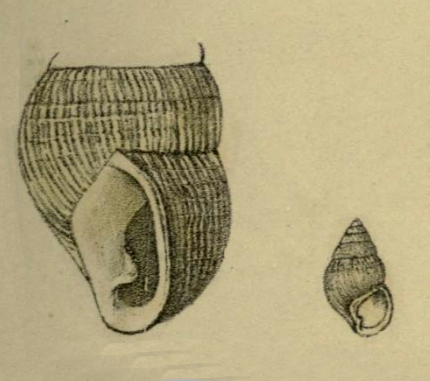
- Shell of Amastra vetusta

Scientific classification
- Kingdom: Animalia
- Phylum: Mollusca
- Class: Gastropoda
- Order: Stylommatophora
- Family: Amastridae
- Genus: Amastra
- Species: A. vetusta

Binomial name
- Amastra vetusta (Baldwin, 1895)

Synonyms
- Achatinella (Amastra) vetusta Baldwin, 1895 superseded combination; Amastra (Metamastra) vetusta (Baldwin, 1895) alternative representation

= Amastra vetusta =

Species of mollusc

Amastra vetusta is a species of air-breathing land snail, a terrestrial pulmonate gastropod mollusc in the family Amastridae.

== Description ==
The length of the shell attains 13 mm, its diameter 7.5 mm.

(Later supplemental description by Hyatt, A. & Pilsbry, H. A. ) The shell is minutely rimate, oblong-conic, and relatively thick and solid. Known exclusively from fossil specimens, it is whitish and lacks a cuticle. The spire is slightly conic, tapering toward a subacute apex. There are 6 1/3 whorls, which are only slightly convex.

The initial half-whorl is smooth, followed by two embryonic whorls finely sculptured with deeply engraved, slightly arched longitudinal striae. Subsequent whorls are more coarsely sculptured with prominent, closely spaced longitudinal wrinkles intersected by a few irregularly placed spiral lines, as if etched on a softer surface.

The aperture is small, ovate, and nearly vertical. The outer lip is thickened and obtuse, with a strong inner reinforcement. The columella bears a subhorizontal lamella that appears modest in a frontal view but is notably prominent in an oblique view of the aperture. The parietal callus is substantial, particularly at its margin.

Amastra vetusta exhibits the characteristic shell thickening and coarse sculpture commonly observed in land snails inhabiting arid environments with minimal shade or cover.

== Distribution ==
This species is endemic to Hawaii, occurring on Oahu Island.
