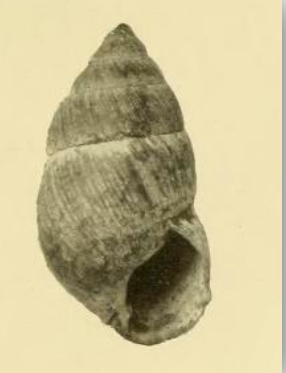
- Shell of Amastra ricei (holotype)

Scientific classification
- Kingdom: Animalia
- Phylum: Mollusca
- Class: Gastropoda
- Order: Stylommatophora
- Family: Amastridae
- Genus: Amastra
- Species: A. ricei

Binomial name
- Amastra ricei C. M. Cooke, 1917

Synonyms
- Amastra (Armialla) ricei C. M. Cooke, 1917 alternative representation

= Amastra ricei =

Species of gastropod

Amastra ricei is a species of air-breathing land snail, a terrestrial pulmonate gastropod mollusc in the family Amastridae.

== Description ==
The length of the shell attains 24.7 mm, its diameter 13 mm.

(Original description) The shell is imperforate, dextral, elongate, ovate-conic, and solid. In freshly deceased specimens, the coloration is benzo-brown with a broad, yellowish-white band below the sutures and a basal patch of the same hue.

The spire is elongate, with convex outlines and an acute apex. The first embryonic whorl is smooth, polished, and slightly convex, while the second is flatter, displaying rather strong, nearly straight, uneven striae. The post-embryonic whorls are regularly and closely sculptured with coarse growth-wrinkles, with the last two additionally marked by very faint, close, and irregular spiral striae.

The body whorl is cylindrical, ascending rather sharply just behind the peristome. The aperture is relatively long and narrow, with its regularly curved outer margin adorned by a well-defined lip-rib. The columella is slender and nearly perpendicular, with its outer margin impressed into the surface of the shell and bearing a low, blunt, oblique fold near the base. This fold terminates gradually near the outer margin of the columella.

== Distribution ==
This species is endemic to Hawai, occurring on Kauai Island.
