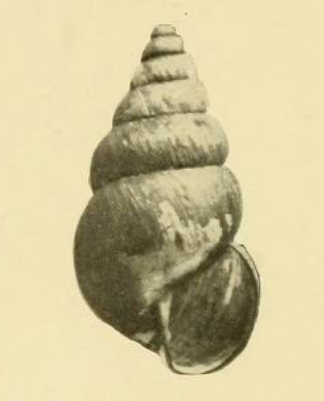
- Shell of Amastra gouveii (holotype)

Scientific classification
- Kingdom: Animalia
- Phylum: Mollusca
- Class: Gastropoda
- Order: Stylommatophora
- Family: Amastridae
- Genus: Amastra
- Species: A. gouveii

Binomial name
- Amastra gouveii C. M. Cooke, 1917

Synonyms
- Amastra (Amastrella) gouveii C. M. Cooke, 1917 alternative representation

= Amastra gouveii =

Species of gastropod

Amastra gouveii is a species of air-breathing land snail, a terrestrial pulmonate gastropod mollusc in the family Amastridae.

== Description ==
The length of the shell attains 12.4 mm, its diameter 6.2 mm.

(Original description) The shell is narrowly perforate, conic, and very thin, with a translucent structure. Its surface is irregularly striated and covered with a uniform Dresden-brown epidermis, which is slightly lighter below the periphery. The spire is narrowly conical, tapering to an acute apex.

The shell comprises nearly seven convex whorls. The whorls of the protoconch are distinctly and finely striated in a regular pattern, while the subsequent whorls are irregularly striated, with the striae being arcuate and blunt. The body whorl is relatively short, rotund, and bluntly angular at the margin of the perforation.

The aperture is rather broad and slightly oblique, with the outer margin almost uniformly curved. It is only faintly angular at its junction with the columella and shows minimal thickening along the peristome's outer margin. The columella is straight and narrow, arching above the narrow, compressed perforation, and is equipped near its base with a minute, deeply seated oblique fold.

== Distribution ==
This species is endemic to Hawai, occurring on Oahu Island.
