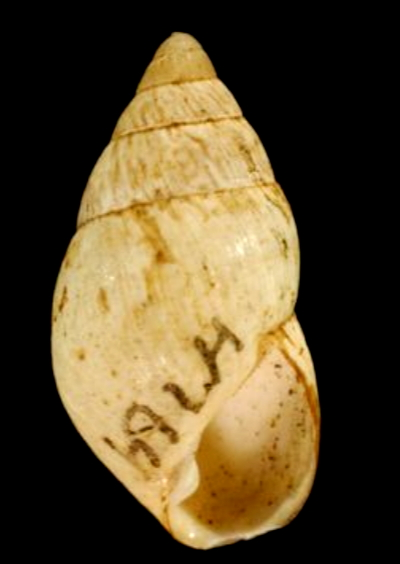
- Shell of Amastra flavescens (specimen at the Natural History Museum Rotterdam)

Scientific classification
- Kingdom: Animalia
- Phylum: Mollusca
- Class: Gastropoda
- Order: Stylommatophora
- Family: Amastridae
- Genus: Amastra
- Species: A. flavescens

Binomial name
- Amastra flavescens (Newcomb, 1854)

Synonyms
- Achatinella flavescens Newcomb, 1854 superseded combination; Amastra (Amastrella) flavescens (Newcomb, 1854) alternative representation

= Amastra flavescens =

Species of gastropod

Amastra flavescens is a species of land snail, a terrestrial pulmonate gastropod mollusc in the family Amastridae.

Subspecies

- Amastra flavescens emortua C. M. Cooke, 1917
- Amastra flavescens flavescens (Newcomb, 1854)
- Amastra flavescens henshawi Baldwin, 1903
- Amastra flavescs senaxicola Baldwin, 1903

== Description ==
The length of the shell attains 14.8 mm.

(Original description) The shell is dextral and conical, composed of six slightly rounded whorls with a simple, well-impressed suture. The surface is adorned with numerous, well-developed longitudinal striations. The aperture is semi-ovate, with a simple lip, and the short columella features an oblique plaited tooth.

Externally, the shell displays a uniform light reddish-yellow coloration, while the interior is either white or pale rose.

== Distribution ==
This marine species is endemic to Hawaii.
