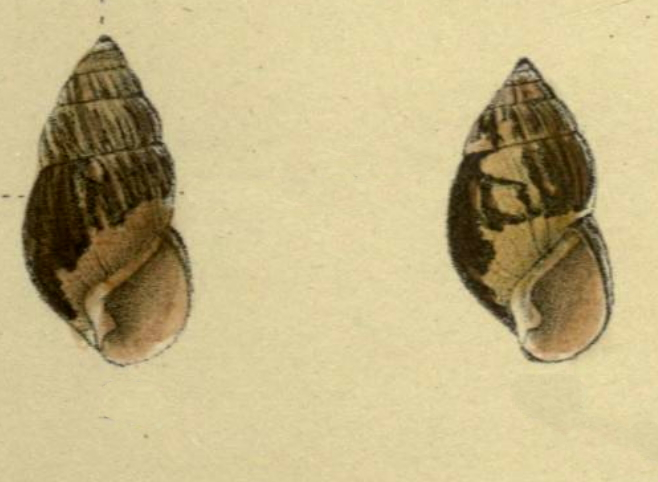
- Two shells of Amastra aurostoma

Scientific classification
- Kingdom: Animalia
- Phylum: Mollusca
- Class: Gastropoda
- Order: Stylommatophora
- Family: Amastridae
- Genus: Amastra
- Species: A. aurostoma

Binomial name
- Amastra aurostoma Baldwin, 1896

Synonyms
- Amastra (Amastra) aurostoma Baldwin, 1896 alternative representation

= Amastra aurostoma =

Species of mollusc

Amastra aurostoma is a species of air-breathing land snail, a terrestrial pulmonate gastropod mollusc in the family Amastridae.

== Description ==
The length of the shell attains 25 mm, its diameter 12 mm.

(Later supplemental description by Hyatt, A. & Pilsbry, H. A. ) The shell is imperforate, oblong-conic, and solid, with a yellow base overlaid by a dark chestnut-brown cuticle that is smooth, somewhat glossy, and streaked with yellow on the spire. The apex is reddish-brown. The whorls of the protoconch are distinctly costate and carinate, with the carina situated very close to the suture.

The subsequent whorls are slightly convex, marked by low striae that become weaker on the body whorl, which is regularly elliptical and lacks malleation. The aperture is ovate and yellow on the interior. The outer lip is simple, without a thickened lip rib. The columella is yellow, featuring a prominent fold of the same color. The parietal callus is tinted and typically thickened.

When fully extended in motion, the animal matches the length of its shell. The mantle is dark slate, bordered on the outer edge with reddish-brown. The foot is very dark brown on both the upper and lower surfaces, with the sides adorned by large patches of an even darker shade, while the posterior portion is tinged with red. The head and tentacles are densely covered with nearly black granulations, adding a striking contrast.

== Distribution ==
This species is endemic to Hawaii, occurring on Lanai Island.
