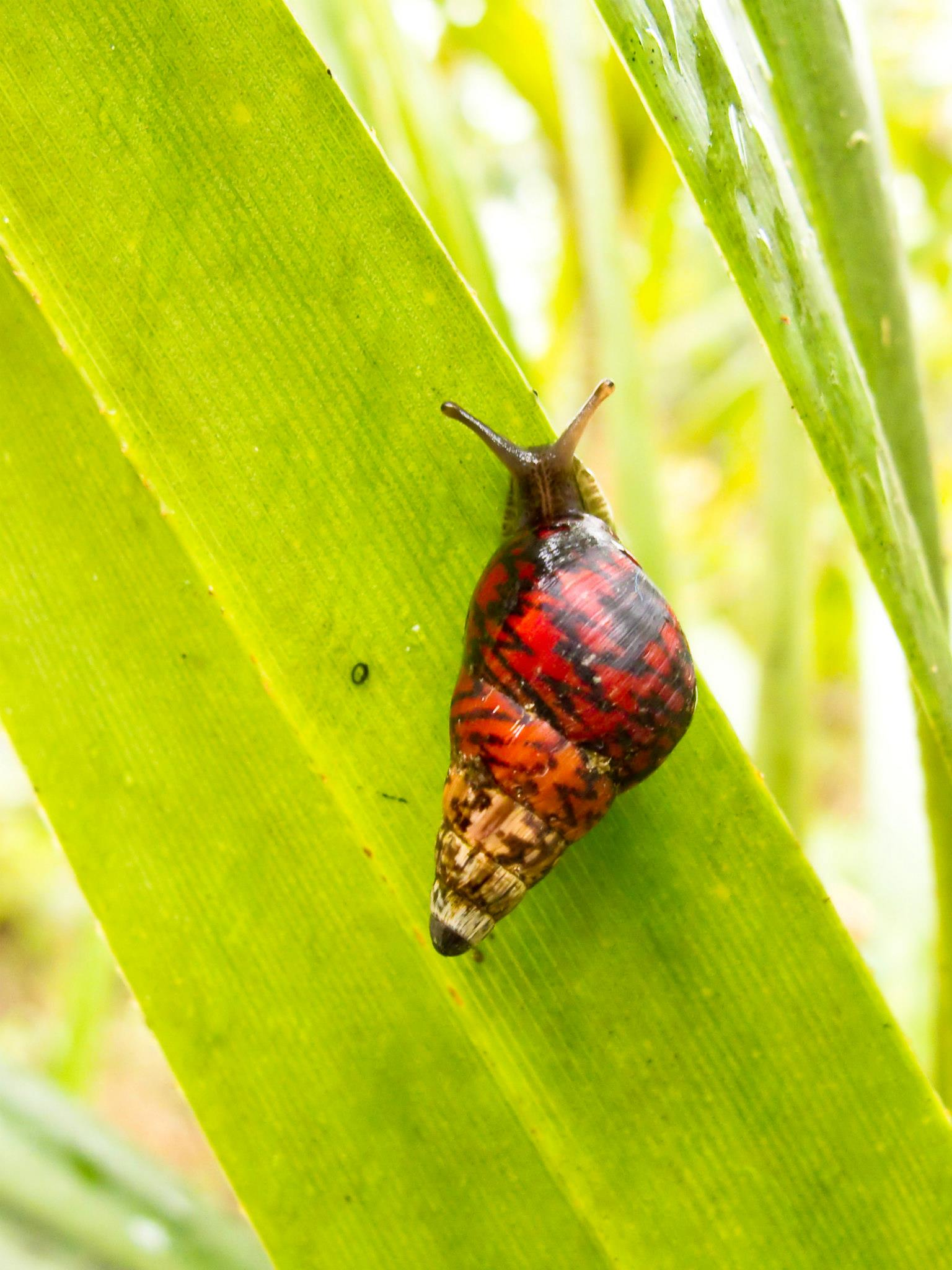

Conservation status
- Critically Endangered (IUCN 2.3)

- Critically Imperiled (NatureServe)

Scientific classification
- Kingdom: Animalia
- Phylum: Mollusca
- Class: Gastropoda
- Order: Stylommatophora
- Family: Amastridae
- Genus: Laminella
- Species: L. sanguinea

Binomial name
- Laminella sanguinea (Newcomb, 1853)

= Laminella sanguinea =

Sanguine tree snail

Species of gastropod

Laminella sanguinea is a species of small air-breathing land snails, terrestrial pulmonate gastropod mollusks in the family Amastridae. This species is endemic to the Hawaiian Islands. This species is ground-dwelling and often has debris on its shell to camouflage itself.

== Description ==
Laminella sanguinea, possesses a solid, thin calcareous shell which measures about 2 centimeters in length. The cone-shaped shell has a distinctive zigzag pattern that resembles the Kike'eke'e kapa pattern and is commonly found covered in feces, which is said too help them camouflage. The base of the shell starts off a brownish-red tint and slowly transitions into a tan color at the tip. Its slimy and squishy body is a translucent grey and has the ability to retract into its shell.

== Distribution ==
This species is endemic to mesic forests in the Wai'anae Mountains of O'ahu.

== Habitat ==
Laminella sanguinea, currently resides in a habitat dominated by Freycinetia arborea (i`e i`e) along rocky and craggy areas in several locations in the Wai`anae Mountains. This species is extremely rare and can be usually found in the trees and on the ground where it nourishes on dead and decaying leaf material. They are threatened by invasive predators (Euglandina, rats, Oxychilus), habitat destruction, and over collecting.
