= Laminella aspera =

Amastrid Land Snail

Scientific classification
- Kingdom: Animalia
- Phylum: Mollusca
- Class: Gastropoda
- Order: Stylommatophora
- Family: Amastridae
- Genus: Laminella
- Species: L. aspera

Binomial name
- Laminella aspera Baldwin, 1908

Species of land snail

Laminella aspera is a land snail belonging to the family Amastridae.

== Description ==
The length of the shell attains 10 mm, its diameter 7 mm.

The sinistral shell is minutely perforated, thin and conical. The apex is obtuse. The surface exhibits very coarse and irregular growth striae. The color of the shell is yellow, plain or marked with irregular black lineations, the apex black. The shell contains 6 convex whorls. The suture is well impressed. The aperture is a little oblique, sub-rotund, yellowish within. The peristome is simple and very thin. The columella is white, biplicate and not prominent.

== Distribution ==
This species is endemic to the Wailuku Valley, West Maui, Hawaiian Islands, .
