= Amastra mirabilis =

Scientific classification
- Kingdom: Animalia
- Phylum: Mollusca
- Class: Gastropoda
- Order: Stylommatophora
- Family: Amastridae
- Genus: Amastra
- Species: A. mirabilis

Binomial name
- Amastra mirabilis C. M. Cooke, 1917

Synonyms
- Amastra (Amastra) mirabilis C. M. Cooke, 1917 alternative representation

Species of gastropod

Amastra mirabilis is a species of air-breathing land snail, a terrestrial pulmonate gastropod mollusc in the family Amastridae.

== Description ==
The length of the shell attains 15.8 mm, its diameter 9 mm.

(Original description) The shell is imperforate, sinistral, and ovately conic, with nearly straight spire outlines above that become convex below. In its fossilized state, the last two whorls are white, transitioning to a darker hue above, with the apical whorls exhibiting a deep reddish-brown coloration. In two specimens, remnants of a thin, dark greenish-brown epidermis are evident.

The whorls of the protoconch are flattened, with the first whorl nearly smooth and the subsequent whorl distinctly costate. The ribs terminate in a carina positioned well above the deep suture. The remaining whorls are regularly sculptured with fine growth striae. The body whorl is large and rounded.

The aperture is very oblique and sizable, comprising nearly half the shell's length. Its outer margin is prominently convex and reinforced by a distinct lip rib. The columella is short and broad, with its outer edge closely appressed to the shell. The columellar fold is strong, nearly median in position, subtransverse, and terminates abruptly near the columellar margin.

== Distribution ==
This species is endemic to Hawai, occurring on Maui Island.
