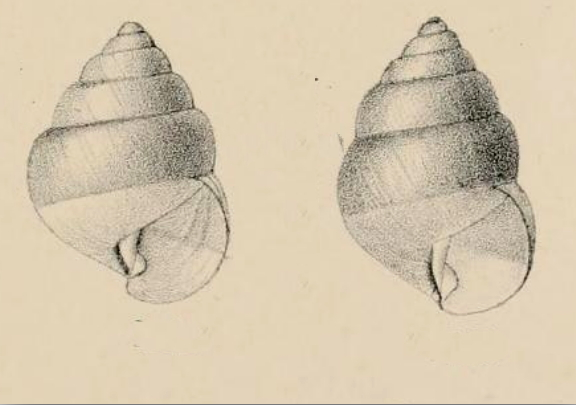
- Shell of Amastra eos (holotype)

Scientific classification
- Kingdom: Animalia
- Phylum: Mollusca
- Class: Gastropoda
- Order: Stylommatophora
- Family: Amastridae
- Genus: Amastra
- Species: A. eos

Binomial name
- Amastra eos Pilsbry & C. M. Cooke, 1914

Synonyms
- Amastra (Metamastra) eos Pilsbry & C. M. Cooke, 1914 · alternative representation

= Amastra eos =

Species of mollusc

Amastra eos is a species of air-breathing land snail, a terrestrial pulmonate gastropod mollusc in the family Amastridae.

== Description ==
The length of the shell attains 12.4 mm, its diameter 8 mm.

(Original description) The thin shell is perforate and globose-conic. It has a chestnut-brown coloration that deepens along the suture, while the base is paler, often marguerite yellow near the axis. The surface is slightly lustrous, finely and irregularly striate, and lacks spiral lines. The apical whorls are smooth, with the spire displaying straight outlines above and convex contours below. The whorls are strongly convex just below the suture. The outer lip is thin, and the columellar lamella is also thin and moderately oblique.

The color division on the body whorl is typically distinct and abrupt in immature shells. However, in mature specimens, the colors tend to blend, although the bipartite pattern remains discernible upon close examination.

== Distribution ==
This species is endemic to Hawaii and occurs on Oahu Island.
