= Amastra laeva =

Scientific classification
- Kingdom: Animalia
- Phylum: Mollusca
- Class: Gastropoda
- Order: Stylommatophora
- Family: Amastridae
- Genus: Amastra
- Species: A. laeva

Binomial name
- Amastra laeva Baldwin, 1906

Synonyms
- Amastra (Heteramastra) laeva Baldwin, 1896 alternative representation; Amastra (Laminella) laeva Baldwin, 1906 original combination

Species of mollusc

Amastra laeva is a species of air-breathing land snail, a terrestrial pulmonate gastropod mollusc in the family Amastridae.

== Description ==
The length of the shell attains 12 mm, its diameter 5 mm.

The shell is sinistral, imperforate, and relatively thin, with a conically turreted shape and an acute apex. The surface is finely striated with incremental growth lines, while the whorls of the protoconch display delicate radiating sulcations. The coloration is brown, adorned with irregular patches of a dark, fugacious epidermis. There are six somewhat convex whorls, with the suture distinctly impressed.

The aperture is oblique and oval, with a livid-white interior. The peristome is simple and thin, and the columella concludes in a slender lamellar plait.

== Distribution ==
This species is endemic to Hawaii, occurring on Maui Island.
