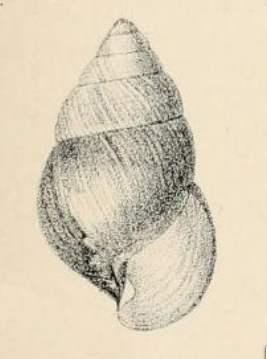
- Shell of Amastra kaunakakaiensis (holotype)

Scientific classification
- Kingdom: Animalia
- Phylum: Mollusca
- Class: Gastropoda
- Order: Stylommatophora
- Family: Amastridae
- Genus: Amastra
- Species: A. kaunakakaiensis

Binomial name
- Amastra kaunakakaiensis Pilsbry & C. M. Cooke, 1914

Synonyms
- Amastra (Amastra) kaunakakaiensis Pilsbry & C. M. Cooke, 1914 · alternative representation

= Amastra kaunakakaiensis =

Species of mollusc

Amastra kaunakakaiensis is a species of air-breathing land snail, a terrestrial pulmonate gastropod mollusc in the family Amastridae.

== Description ==
The length of the shell attains 14.2 mm, its diameter 7.5 mm.

(Original description) The shell is narrowly perforate, oblong-conic, and very thin. It is chestnut brown, glossy, and bare in front of the aperture, while the rest is covered with a delicate russet cuticle that deepens to chestnut and often black on the last half whorl, where it takes on a slight gloss.

The shell contains 5¾ whorls. The embryonic whorls are flattened, carinate, and costate, transitioning to moderately convex subsequent whorls with irregular striations. In younger specimens, up to the middle of the fifth whorl, the whorls are sharply angular, but this angle becomes concealed in adults.

The aperture is dark inside, lacking both a white lining and a lip-rib. The columellar fold is thin and oblique, with the columellar margin reflected, almost entirely closing the perforation.

== Distribution ==
This species is endemic to Hawaii and occurs on Molokai Island.
