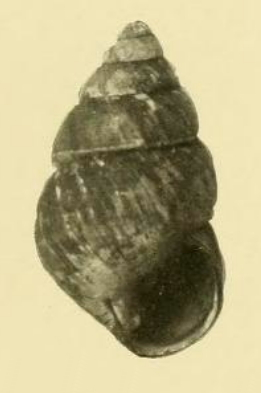
- Shell of Amastra whitei (holotype)

Scientific classification
- Kingdom: Animalia
- Phylum: Mollusca
- Class: Gastropoda
- Order: Stylommatophora
- Family: Amastridae
- Genus: Amastra
- Species: A. whitei

Binomial name
- Amastra whitei C. M. Cooke, 1917

Synonyms
- Amastra (Amastrella) whitei C. M. Cooke, 1917 alternative representation

= Amastra whitei =

Species of gastropod

Amastra whitei is a species of air-breathing land snail, a terrestrial pulmonate gastropod mollusc in the family Amastridae.

== Description ==
The length of the shell attains 12.6 mm, its diameter 6.8 mm.

(Original description) The shell is imperforate, dextral, elongate-conic, and nearly solid, with a light brownish-vinaceous coloration and a thin cuticle of dresden-brown. It is slightly translucent. The spire is conic, with gently convex outlines and a sharply pointed apex.

The embryonic whorls are slightly lighter in color than the rest, barely convex, almost smooth, and marked by faint, irregular striations. The subsequent whorls are convex and lusterless, featuring subtle, irregular growth lines. The body whorl has a faint angularity at the periphery, with the angle extending onto the penultimate whorl just above the suture.

The aperture is relatively narrow, with the outer lip being evenly curved and slightly thickened internally, bordered by a dark margin. The columella is narrow, flattened, and closely appressed to the shell. The columellar fold is prominent, oblique, and terminates abruptly at the columellar margin.

== Distribution ==
This species is endemic to Hawai, occurring near Kahauloa.
