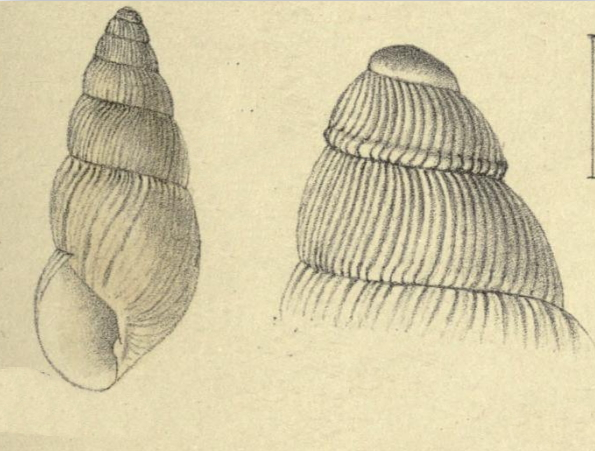
- Shell of Amastra sinistrorsa

Scientific classification
- Kingdom: Animalia
- Phylum: Mollusca
- Class: Gastropoda
- Order: Stylommatophora
- Family: Amastridae
- Genus: Amastra
- Species: A. sinistrorsa

Binomial name
- Amastra sinistrorsa Baldwin, 1906

Synonyms
- Amastra (Heteramastra) sinistrorsa Baldwin, 1896 alternative representation

= Amastra sinistrorsa =

Species of mollusc

Amastra sinistrorsa is a species of air-breathing land snail, a terrestrial pulmonate gastropod mollusc in the family Amastridae.

== Description ==
The length of the shell attains 14.7 mm, its diameter 6.2 mm

The shell contains 6½ whorls. It is imperforate, sinistral, and lanceolate and has a relatively thin structure. The spire is elongated, featuring straight outlines. The first half-whorl is smooth and convex, forming an obtuse apex. The following whorl is flattened and subacutely carinate near the base, adorned with fine, curved riblets. On subsequent whorls, the carina diminishes and eventually disappears, while the riblets become finer and more closely spaced. The later whorls are moderately convex, displaying rather coarse growth wrinkles and lacking angularity above the impressed suture.

The aperture is strongly oblique, with a thin outer lip. The columella is straight, its edge narrowly reflexed and adnate above, bearing a small, very oblique fold.

== Distribution ==
This species is endemic to Hawaii, occurring on the main island at Hamakua.
