= Amastra pagodula =

Scientific classification
- Kingdom: Animalia
- Phylum: Mollusca
- Class: Gastropoda
- Order: Stylommatophora
- Family: Amastridae
- Genus: Amastra
- Species: A. pagodula

Binomial name
- Amastra pagodula C. M. Cooke, 1917

Synonyms
- Amastra (Amastrella) pagodula C. M. Cooke, 1917 alternative representation

Species of gastropod

Amastra pagodula is a species of air-breathing land snail, a terrestrial pulmonate gastropod mollusc in the family Amastridae.

== Description ==
The length of the shell attains 10.9 mm, its diameter 7.4 mm.

(Original description) The shell is narrowly umbilicate, dextral, conic, and thin. In its fossilized state, the upper whorls are ochraceous-orange, while the body whorl is lighter in color, fading into a broad white patch behind the peristome. The spire is conic with an acute apex and nearly straight outlines.

The whorls of the protoconch are slightly extended and flatly convex, with the first whorl smooth and polished and the second minutely and closely striated. The subsequent whorls are nearly flat and obliquely sculptured with coarse, irregular growth wrinkles. The body whorl is short and strongly carinate, with the carina positioned above the suture of the preceding two whorls. The base is flattened and somewhat contracted around the umbilicus. The carina is slightly granulose, flattened below, and bordered along its lower margin by a shallow sulcus.

The aperture is small, very oblique, and distinctly contracted at the top, nearly quadrate in outline. The outer margin, modified by the carina, forms an obtuse angle. Above the carina, the margin is slightly flattened, while below, it is gently arcuate, forming an angle with the base of the columella and reinforced by a thin, delicate lip rib.

The columella is narrowly triangular, with its inner margin slightly oblique and its outer margin thin and semi-erect. The columellar fold is large, nearly basal in position, subtransverse, and terminates abruptly at the outer margin of the columella. The umbilicus is nearly circular, with a sharply defined and slightly contracted margin, and is broader internally.

== Distribution ==
This species is endemic to Hawai, occurring in Pleistocene strata.
