= Leptachatina lepida =

Conservation status
- Endangered (IUCN 2.3)

- Critically Imperiled (NatureServe)

Scientific classification
- Kingdom: Animalia
- Phylum: Mollusca
- Class: Gastropoda
- Order: Stylommatophora
- Family: Amastridae
- Genus: Leptachatina
- Species: L. lepida

Binomial name
- Leptachatina lepida Cooke, 1910

Species of gastropod

Leptachatina lepida is a species of small air-breathing land snails, terrestrial pulmonate gastropod mollusks in the family Amastridae. It is endemic to the Hawaiian Islands.

== Distribution and habitat ==
Leptachatina lepida is endemic to the island of Hawaii. It can be found in the saddle region between the volcanic mountains of Mauna Kea and Mauna Loa. It inhabits forested and dry land environments and is typically associated with leaf litter.

== Ecology ==
Oxychilus alliarius, commonly known as the European garlic snail, is an invasive snail that has been identified as one of the predators of L. lepida. These omnivorous mollusks are abundant at the Pu’uwa’awa’a Forest Reserve where L. lepida can be found and may contribute to predation pressure on other native snails. European introduced mammalian predators, including the Polynesian rats and black rats prey on Leptachatina lepida. Other threats include habitat destruction due to military activities or construction in the area, as well as predation by the slug Euglandina rosea.
