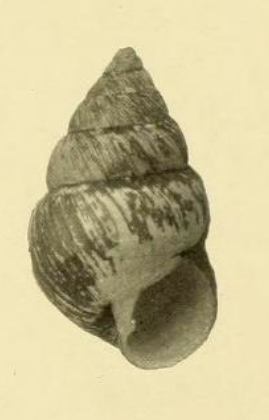
- Shell of Amastra viriosa (holotype)

Scientific classification
- Kingdom: Animalia
- Phylum: Mollusca
- Class: Gastropoda
- Order: Stylommatophora
- Family: Amastridae
- Genus: Amastra
- Species: A. viriosa

Binomial name
- Amastra viriosa C. M. Cooke, 1917

Synonyms
- Amastra (Amastrella) viriosa C. M. Cooke, 1917 alternative representation

= Amastra viriosa =

Species of gastropod

Amastra viriosa is a species of air-breathing land snail, a terrestrial pulmonate gastropod mollusc in the family Amastridae.

== Description ==
The length of the shell attains 20.6 mm, its diameter 11.7 mm.

(Original description) The shell is openly perforate, ovately conical, and thick. The cuticle is Brussels-brown, while the undercolor of the body whorl is pale olive-buff, and the remaining whorls display a vinaceous-fawn hue.

The upper part of the spire is nearly straight in its conical shape, transitioning into the penultimate and body whorls, which are noticeably convex and slightly shouldered above. The embryonic whorls are nearly flat, almost smooth, and significantly darker than the subsequent whorls. In young specimens, under magnification, the embryonic whorls exhibit minute and nearly regular striations. The later whorls are coarsely and irregularly striate, and in some specimens, the body whorl is irregularly malleated.

The aperture is relatively small for the size of the shell, slightly contracted above, and lacks distinct thickening along the outer lip. The columella is slightly oblique, curving backward near the base, and flattened above the perforation. The columellar fold is moderately weak, oblique, positioned submedially, and does not extend fully to the margin of the columella.

== Distribution ==
This species is endemic to Hawai, occurring near Kahauloa.
