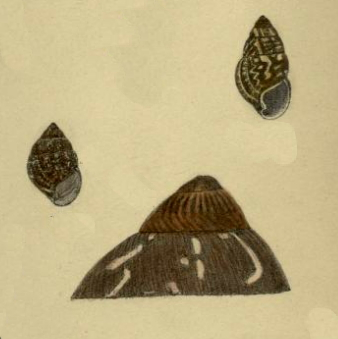
- Shell of Amastra badia

Scientific classification
- Kingdom: Animalia
- Phylum: Mollusca
- Class: Gastropoda
- Order: Stylommatophora
- Family: Amastridae
- Genus: Amastra
- Species: A. badia

Binomial name
- Amastra badia (Baldwin, 1895)

Synonyms
- Achatinella (Amastra) badia Baldwin, 1895 superseded combination; Amastra (Metamastra) badia (Baldwin, 1895) alternative representation

= Amastra badia =

Species of mollusc

Amastra badia is a species of air-breathing land snail, a terrestrial pulmonate gastropod mollusc in the family Amastridae.

== Description ==
The length of the shell attains 17 mm, its diameter 12 mm.

(Original description) The shell contains 6½ whorls. The shell is dextral, imperforate, relatively thin, and elongately ovate-conic. Its surface is glossy, adorned with delicate, closely spaced thread-like rib-striae aligned with the growth lines. The whorls of the protoconch are distinctly radiately sulcated.

The shell's coloration is a rich dark chestnut-brown, decorated with light brown zigzag or undulating lines and markings. It consists of 6½ slightly convex whorls, with a moderately impressed suture.

The aperture is oval and slightly oblique, with a livid white interior that subtly reveals the brown exterior coloration. The peristome is acute and minimally thickened on the inner side. The columella is white, flexuous, and ends abruptly in a thin, slightly arched lamellar plait.

(Later supplemental description by Hyatt, A. & Pilsbry, H. A. ) In color, pattern and sculpture of the later whorls this form resembles Amastra undata (Baldwin, 1895). Whether there are spiral decussating lines on the body whorl of the type specimen was not stated by Baldwin, but they are present in one specimen examined from Moanalua, wanting in another. In those from Waimano the spirals are either very faint, hardly noticeable, or wanting. A. badia differs from A. undata by its embryonic sculpture and the less obese, more ovate shape.

The columellar lamella penetrates two whorls. The axis is imperforate in the adult and later neanic stages, but in the half -grown shell there is a rather widely open umbilicus, width about 1 mm. The embryonic whorls are much more strongly sculptured than in A. undata. After the smooth initial half -whorl, coarse vertical ribs appear, changing to an irregular coarse malleation on the last half of the second whorl. Then short, rather coarse protractive ribs appear below the suture, while above the lower suture there is another system of smaller, retractive folds, the two systems interfering about the middle of the whorl. The third whorl has fine growth-lines only, and the color-pattern appears as a few white spots and irregular stripes. The ground-color of adults is dark red, upon which there are yellow streaks or spots. In some shells from Aeia the body whorl has a yellow suffusion, faintly mottled with dark. The shell is quite thin.

== Distribution ==
This species is endemic to Hawaii, occurring on Oahu Island.
