= Amastra nannodes =

Scientific classification
- Kingdom: Animalia
- Phylum: Mollusca
- Class: Gastropoda
- Order: Stylommatophora
- Family: Amastridae
- Genus: Amastra
- Species: A. nannodes

Binomial name
- Amastra nannodes C. M. Cooke, 1933

Synonyms
- Amastra (Heteramastra) nannodes C. M. Cooke, 1933 alternative representation

Species of gastropod

Amastra nannodes is a species of air-breathing land snail, a terrestrial pulmonate gastropod mollusc in the family Amastridae.

== Distribution ==
This species is endemic to Hawai, occurring on Maui Island.
