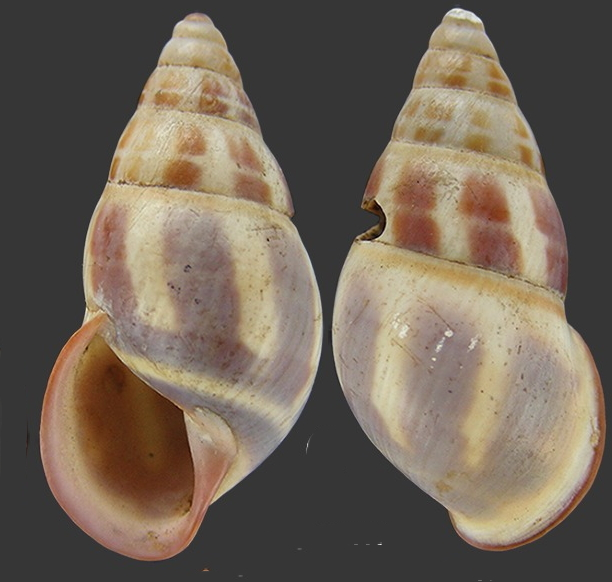
- Shell of Amphidromus eudeli

Scientific classification
- Domain: Eukaryota
- Kingdom: Animalia
- Phylum: Mollusca
- Class: Gastropoda
- Order: Stylommatophora
- Family: Camaenidae
- Genus: Amphidromus
- Species: A. eudeli

Binomial name
- Amphidromus eudeli Ancey, 1897

= Amphidromus eudeli =

Species of tree snail

Amphidromus eudeli is a species of air-breathing tree snail, an arboreal gastropod mollusk in the family Camaenidae.

This is a taxon inquirendum (debated synonym).

== Description ==
The length of the shell attains 28 mm, its diameter 14 mm.

The shell is sinistral and rather solid, presenting an oblong-conic shape with oblique striations and a narrowly rimate base. The spire appears conic with a dark brown apex. Comprising seven convex whorls, the initial ones are dull white, while the fourth and lower ones exhibit a cream color with oblique bluish-gray stripes. These stripes become reddish-brown on the spire and are interrupted at the middle on the penultimate and preceding whorls by a submedian light spiral line, eventually fading at the suture. The last half-whorl is bluish-gray, featuring a cream-yellow band around the middle of the base and an umbilical area of the same tinge. A narrow infra-sutural line of a reddish-brown color is present on the body whorl and penultimate whorl. The aperture is small, oblique, and expanded, with a greyish interior. The columella appears thick and reflected, showing a paler hue at the upper part. The outer lip is thickened and dark-brown externally, with a purple interior, particularly pronounced near the umbilicus.

== Distribution ==
This species is endemic to Vietnam
