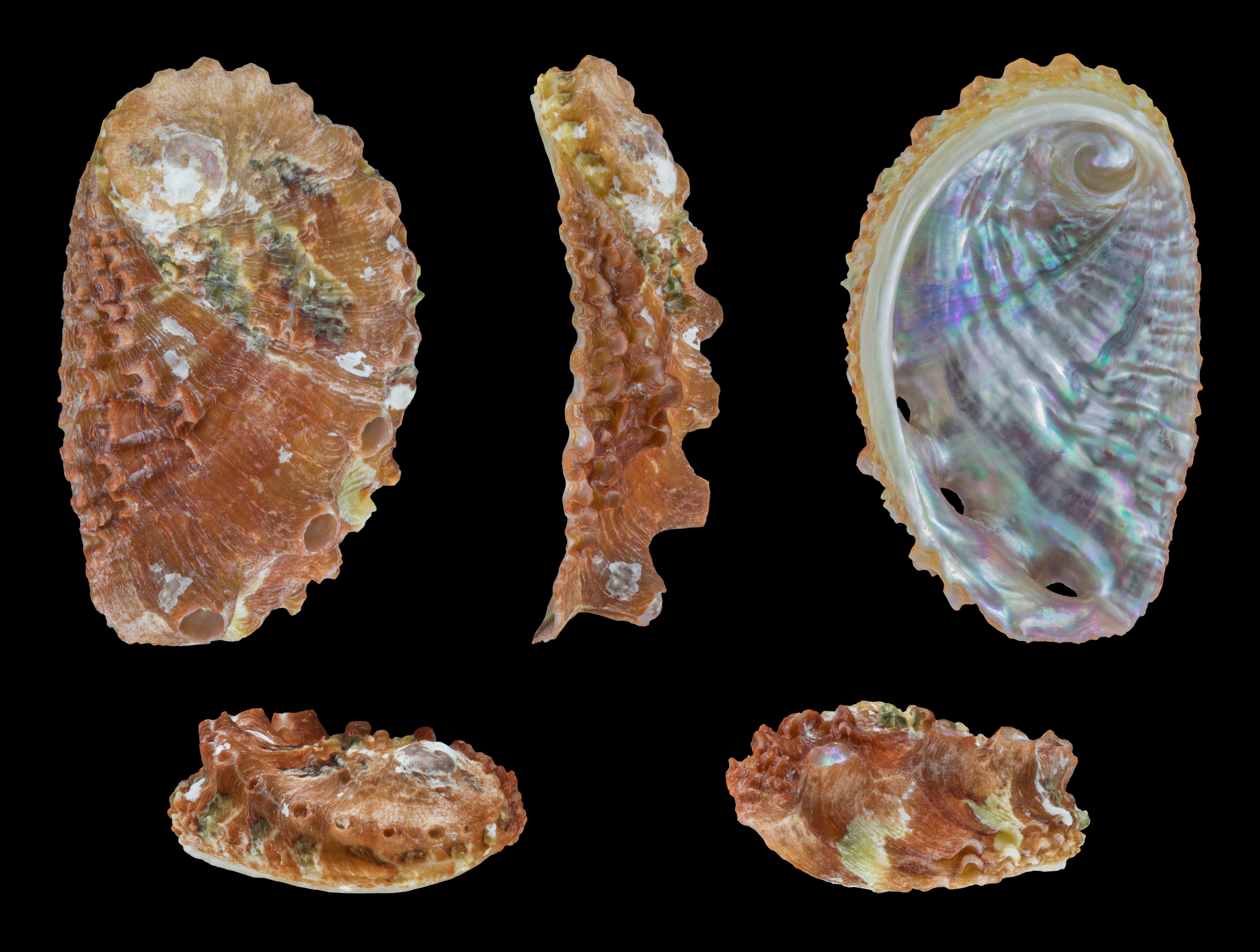

Conservation status
- Least Concern (IUCN 3.1)

Scientific classification
- Kingdom: Animalia
- Phylum: Mollusca
- Class: Gastropoda
- Subclass: Vetigastropoda
- Order: Lepetellida
- Family: Haliotidae
- Genus: Haliotis
- Species: H. jacnensis

Binomial name
- Haliotis jacnensis Reeve, 1846

Synonyms
- Haliotis echinata G. B. Sowerby II, 1882; Haliotis hanleyi Ancey, 1881

= Haliotis jacnensis =

Species of gastropod

Haliotis jacnensis, the Jacna abalone, is a species of marine gastropod in the family Haliotidae.

== Description ==
The shell size varies between 7 and 25 mm (0.28 and 0.98 in). The oblong-ovate shell is spirally peculiarly rudely ridged. The ridges are very irregular and rather scaly, somewhat smooth next the perforations which are slightly tubiferous and distant. The coloration is reddish-orange. The interior surface is silvery. This is a very characteristic species, to which there is little or no approximation in any other.

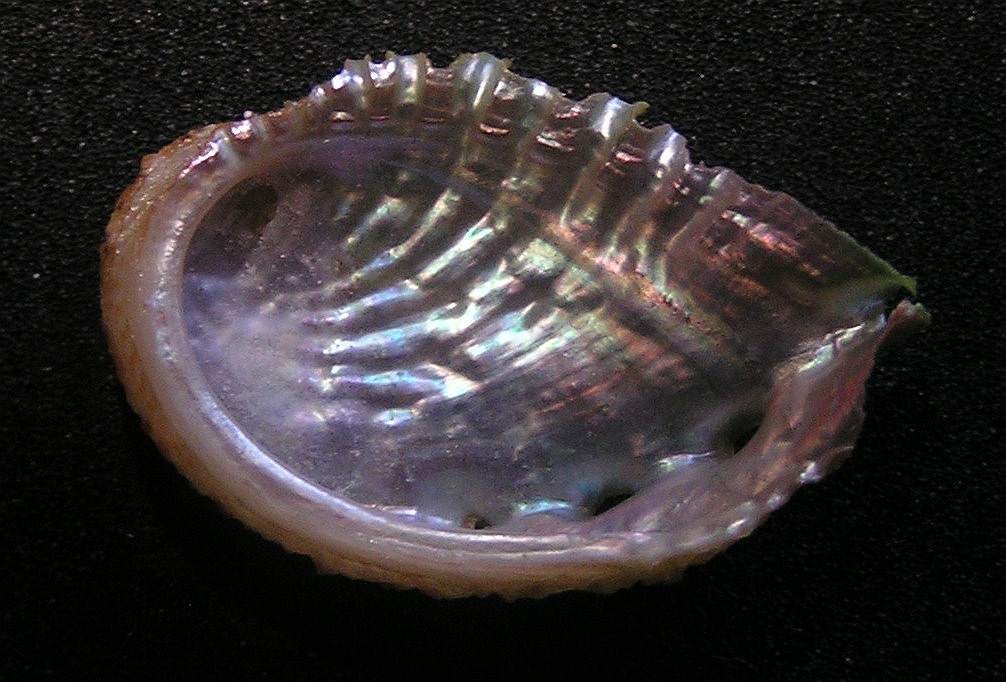
View of the shell from below

== Subspecies ==
There are two subspecies:

- Haliotis jacnensis jacnensis Reeve, 1846
- Haliotis jacnensis kershawi Owen, 2012

== Distribution ==
This species is distributed in the western Pacific Ocean, around the coasts of American Samoa, Fiji, Guam, Indonesia, Japan, Micronesia, New Caledonia, Niue, the Northern Mariana Islands, the Philippines, the Solomon Islands, Tonga, Tuvalu and Vanuatu. It resides at depths between 0 and 50 m (0 and 164 ft).
