= Tropidoptera =

Scientific classification
- Kingdom: Animalia
- Phylum: Mollusca
- Class: Gastropoda
- Order: Stylommatophora
- Family: Amastridae
- Genus: Tropidoptera; Ancey, 1889

Type species
- Endodonta (Pterodiscus) wesleyi Sykes, 1896

Synonyms
- Amastra (Helicamastra) Pilsbry & Vanatta, 1905 junior subjective synonym; Endodonta (Pterodiscus) Pilsbry, 1893 junior subjective synonym; Pterodiscus Pilsbry, 1893 junior subjective synonym

Genus of gastropods

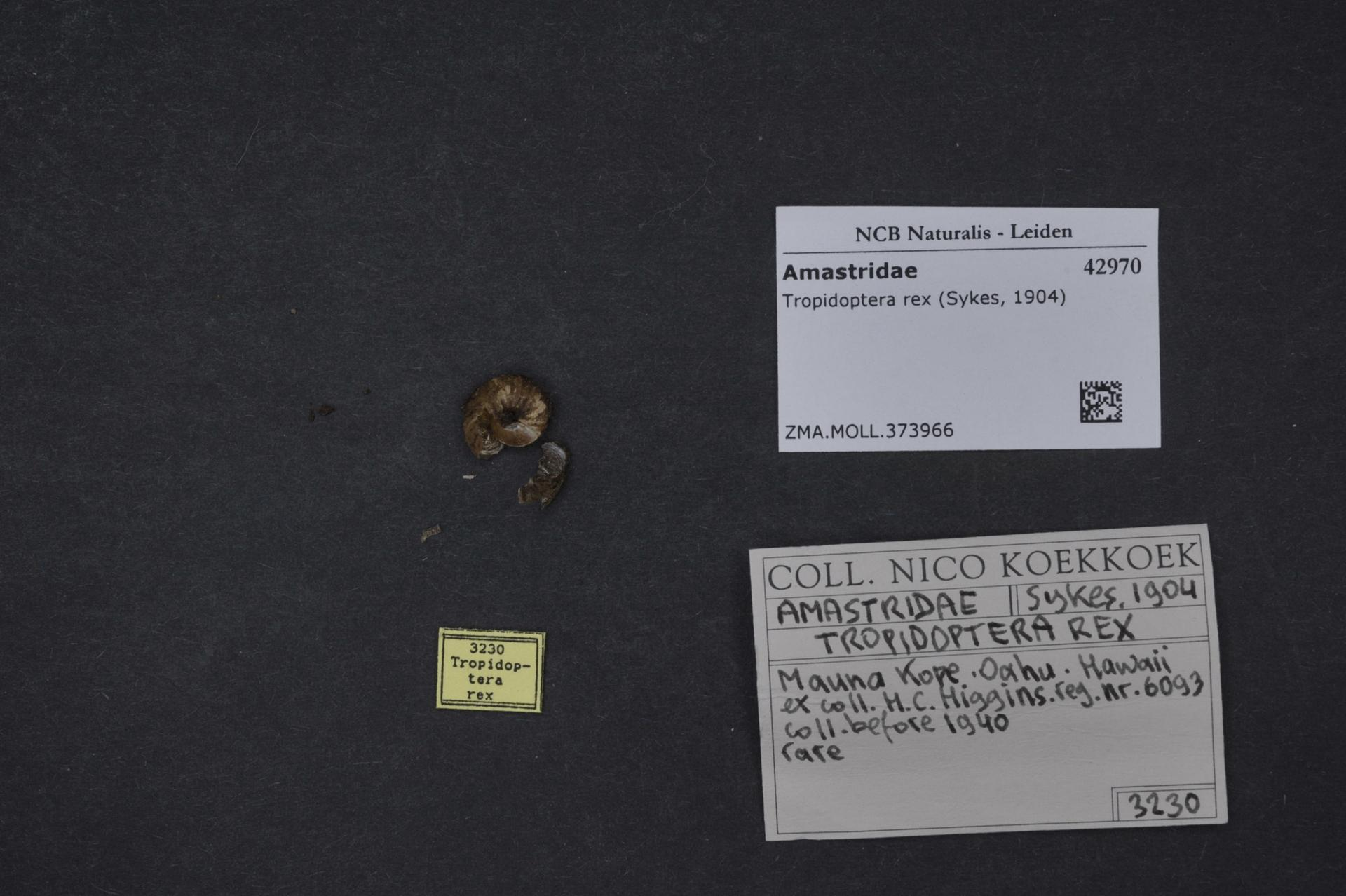

Tropidoptera is a genus of small, air-breathing land snails, terrestrial pulmonate gastropod mollusks in the family Amastridae.

== Description ==
(Described as Endodonta (Pterodiscus)) The shell is umbilicated, depressed, thin, or fragile, with a translucent horny-brown coloration.

The whorls are finely and densely striated, with the body whorl sharply keeled at the periphery and distinctly carinated around the umbilicus. The aperture is oblique and toothless, with a thin, simple lip.

== Distribution ==
It is endemic to the Hawaiian Islands.

== Species ==
Species within the genus Tropidotera include:

- Tropidoptera alata (L. Pfeiffer, 1856)
- Tropidoptera discus (Pilsbry & Vanatta, 1905)
- Tropidoptera heliciformis (Ancey, 1890)
- Tropidoptera rex (Sykes, 1904)
- Tropidoptera wesleyi (Sykes, 1896)
