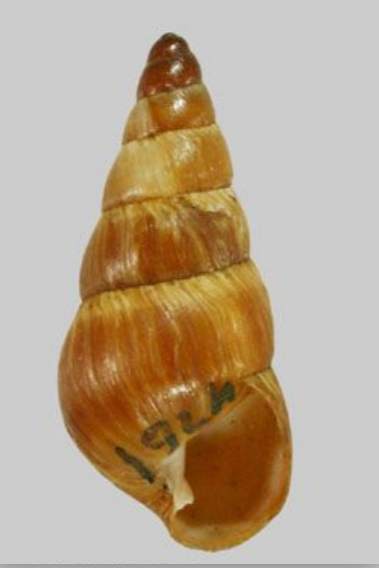
- Shell of Amastra turritella (specimen at the Natural History Museum, Rotterdam)

Scientific classification
- Kingdom: Animalia
- Phylum: Mollusca
- Class: Gastropoda
- Order: Stylommatophora
- Family: Amastridae
- Genus: Amastra
- Species: A. turritella

Binomial name
- Amastra turritella (A. Férussac, 1821)
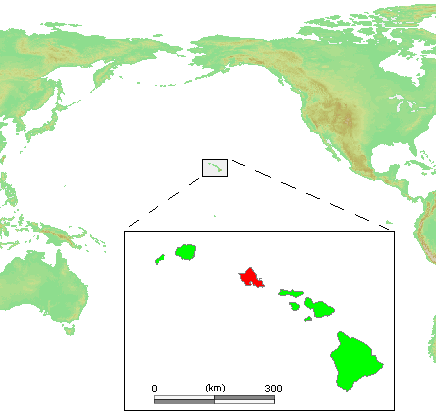
- Location of Oʻahu

Synonyms
- Achatina oahuensis Green, 1827 junior subjective synonym; Achatinella inornata Mighels, 1845 junior subjective synonym; Amastra (Paramastra) turritella (A. Férussac, 1821) alternative representation; Helix (Cochlogena) turritella A. Férussac, 1821 superseded combination; Helix turritella A. Férussac, 1821 superseded combination; Paramastra turritella (A. Férussac, 1821) superseded combination

= Amastra turritella =

Species of gastropod

Amastra turritella is a species of air-breathing land snail, a terrestrial pulmonate gastropod mollusc in the family Amastridae.

Subspecies

- Amastra turritella aiea Hyatt & Pilsbry, 1911
- Amastra turritella turritella (A. Férussac, 1821)
- Amastra turritella waiawa Hyatt & Pilsbry, 1911

== Description ==
The length of the shell can reach 20 mm, its diameter 8.7 mm

The shell is dextral, elongate, and conic with fine striations. It consists of six whorls, ending in an obtuse apex. The suture is distinct and simple, not duplicated.

The aperture is prominently oblong, with the peristome thickened on the interior margin. The columella is nearly straight, perforate, and features a well-defined rib, adding to its structural detail.

The typical form, as illustrated by Ferussac, is characterized by a chestnut-brown coloration. The embryonic shell often appears darker with a purplish hue, although it can also present as whitish-corneous or flesh-colored. The apex is relatively blunt and rounded, with the second embryonic whorl displaying very fine vertical striae, occasionally interrupted by weak spiral lines.

In the adult stage, the shell surface is marked with fine striae overlaying low growth wrinkles. The subsutural region is usually a paler shade, providing a subtle contrast. The aperture is blue-white internally, sometimes exhibiting a faint pink tint. The outer lip is sharp, while the columellar plica is moderately strong, occasionally accompanied by a subtle, oblique fold positioned above it. The axis is generally perforate, completing the distinctive features of the shell.

The animal is compact, measuring only half the length of the shell. It is predominantly dark slate-colored along the sides, with the superior portion and tentacles a deep black. The underside of the foot is light gray, while the mantle is a rich dark brown, adding a subtle contrast to its overall appearance.

== Distribution ==
This species is endemic to Hawai, occurring on Oʻahu.
