= Microphyura =

Scientific classification
- Domain: Eukaryota
- Kingdom: Animalia
- Phylum: Mollusca
- Class: Gastropoda
- Order: Stylommatophora
- Family: Rhytididae
- Genus: Microphyura; Ancey, 1882

Genus of land snails

Microphyura is a genus of gastropods belonging to the family Rhytididae.

The species of this genus are found in Southeastern Asia.

Species:

- Microphyura cornea Franc, 1953
- Microphyura denisi Franc, 1953
- Microphyura jeanneneyi (Dupuy, 1894)
- Microphyura microphis (Crosse, 1868)
- Microphyura nightingali Saurin, 1960
