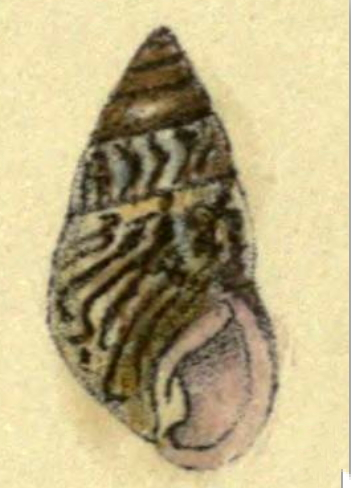
- Amastra mucronata shell

Scientific classification
- Kingdom: Animalia
- Phylum: Mollusca
- Class: Gastropoda
- Order: Stylommatophora
- Family: Amastridae
- Genus: Amastra
- Species: †A. mucronata

Binomial name
- †Amastra mucronata Newcomb, 1853

Synonyms
- Achatinella fusiformis L. Pfeiffer, 1855 junior subjective synonym; Achatinella mucronata Newcomb, 1853 superseded combination; Amastra (Amastra) mucronata (Newcomb, 1853) alternative representation; Amastra (Amastra) simularis W. D. Hartman, 1888 junior subjective synonym; Amastra (Amastra) simularis var. maura Ancey, 1899 junior subjective synonym; Amastra simularis W. D. Hartman, 1888 junior subjective synonym; Amastra simularis var. maura Ancey, 1899 junior subjective synonym; Amastra simularis var. roseotincta Sykes, 1896 junior subjective synonym

= Amastra mucronata =

Species of gastropod

Amastra mucronata is a species of air-breathing land snails, terrestrial pulmonate gastropod mollusks in the family Amastridae.

Subspecies

- Amastra mucronata atroflava Hyatt & Pilsbry, 1911
- Amastra mucronata citrea Sykes, 1896
- Amastra mucronata mucronata (Newcomb, 1853)
- Amastra mucronata semicarnea Ancey & Sykes, 1899
- Amastra mucronata roseotincta Sykes, 1896 (taxon inquirendum)

== Description ==
The length of the shell attains 17.5 mm, its diameter 8 mm.

The shell is dextral, elongate-ovate, and predominantly white, adorned with numerous transverse arrow-headed brown markings. The body whorl, however, is cloaked in a dense, brownish-black epidermis. It is composed of six rounded whorls, with the last one slightly contracted.

The suture is subtly impressed on the upper whorls, becoming more pronounced at the junction with the body whorl. The aperture is small and ovate, while the columella features a distinct twisted plait. The outer lip is simple and unembellished.

== Distribution ==
This species is endemic to Hawai, occurring on Molokai island.
