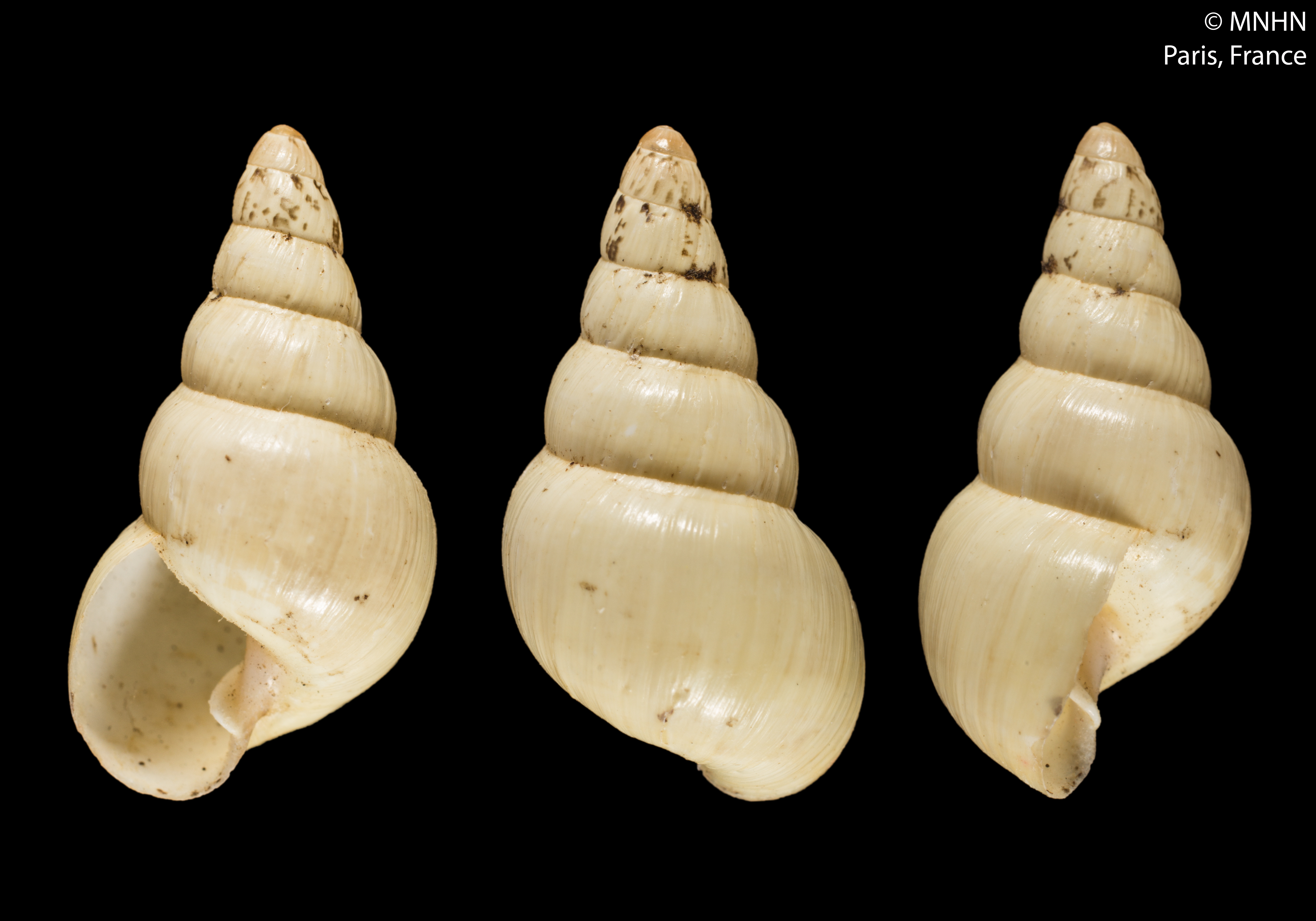
- Shell of Laminella citrina helvina (syntype at MNHN, Paris)

Scientific classification
- Kingdom: Animalia
- Phylum: Mollusca
- Class: Gastropoda
- Order: Stylommatophora
- Infraorder: Pupilloidei
- Superfamily: Pupilloidea
- Family: Amastridae; Gulick, 1873
- Genus: Laminella; Pfeiffer, 1854

Synonyms
- Achatinella (Laminella) L. Pfeiffer, 1854 superseded rank; Amastra (Laminella) L. Pfeiffer, 1854 (unaccepted combination); Helicter (Laminella) L. Pfeiffer, 1854 superseded rank

= Laminella =

Genus of gastropods

Laminella is a genus of small air-breathing land snails, terrestrial pulmonate gastropod mollusks in the family Amastridae.

== Species ==
Species within the genus Laminella include:

- Laminella alexandri (Newcomb, 1865)
- Laminella aspera Baldwin 1908
- Laminella bulbosa (Gulick, 1858)
- Laminella citrina (L. Pfeiffer, 1848)
- Laminella concinna (Newcomb, 1854)
- Laminella depicta (Baldwin, 1895)
- Laminella gravida (Quoy & Gaimard, 1825)
- Laminella kuhnsi (C. M. Cooke, 1908)
- Laminella picta (Mighels, 1845)
- Laminella remyi (Newcomb, 1855)
- Laminella sanguinea (Newcomb, 1854)
- Laminella straminea (Reeve, 1850)
- Laminella tetrao (Newcomb, 1855)
- Laminella venusta (Mighels, 1845)

Synonyms

- Laminella duoplicata Baldwin, 1908: synonym of Laminella alexandri duoplicata Baldwin, 1908 (superseded combination)
- Laminella semivenulata Borcherding, 1906: synonym of Laminella citrina (L. Pfeiffer, 1848) (junior subjective synonym)
