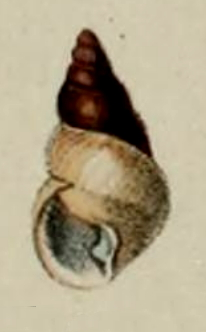
- Shell of Amastra soror (holotype)

Scientific classification
- Kingdom: Animalia
- Phylum: Mollusca
- Class: Gastropoda
- Order: Stylommatophora
- Family: Amastridae
- Genus: Amastra
- Species: A. soror

Binomial name
- Amastra soror (Newcomb, 1854)

Synonyms
- Achatinella soror Newcomb, 1854 superseded combination; Amastra (Heteramastra) soror (Newcomb, 1854) · alternative representation

= Amastra soror =

Species of mollusc

Amastra soror is a species of air-breathing land snail, a terrestrial pulmonate gastropod mollusc in the family Amastridae.

Subspecies

- Amastra soror interjecta Hyatt & Pilsbry, 1911
- Amastra soror laticeps Hyatt & Pilsbry, 1911
- Amastra soror soror (Newcomb, 1854)

== Description ==
The length of the shell attains 11.6 mm.

(Original description) The shell is sinistral and conically turreted, comprising seven rounded whorls with a deeply impressed suture. The aperture is small and subovate, with a simple outer lip. The columella is very short, ending in a twisted plicate tooth.

The thin epidermis is dark corneous on the upper portion and light corneous below.

== Distribution ==
This species is endemic to Hawaii and occurs on Maui Island.
