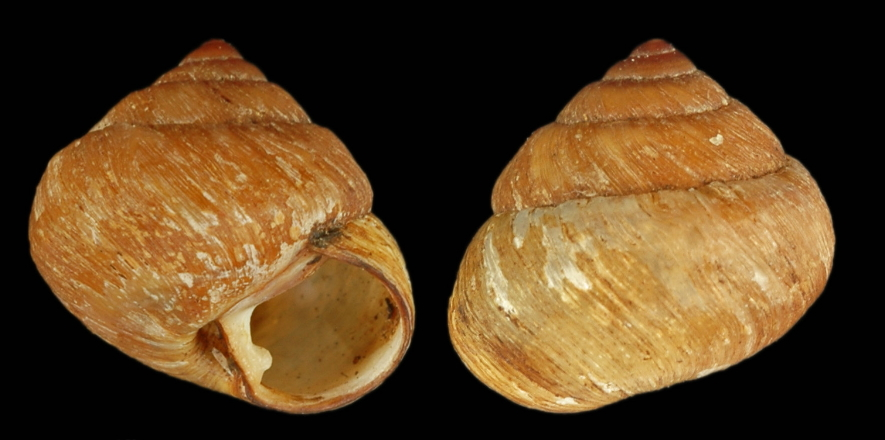
- Shell of Amastra sphaerica (lectotype at MNHN, Paris)

Scientific classification
- Kingdom: Animalia
- Phylum: Mollusca
- Class: Gastropoda
- Order: Stylommatophora
- Family: Amastridae
- Genus: Amastra
- Species: A. sphaerica

Binomial name
- Amastra sphaerica Pease, 1870

Synonyms
- Amastra (Cyclamastra) sphaerica Pease, 1870 alternative representation

= Amastra sphaerica =

Species of mollusc

Amastra sphaerica is a species of air-breathing land snail, a terrestrial pulmonate gastropod mollusc in the family Amastridae.

== Description ==
The length of the shell attains 10.6 mm, its diameter 10.2 mm

The shell is narrowly umbilicate, globose-conic, and moderately solid. The spire is dull purplish-brown, transitioning to purplish-brown or chestnut on the body whorl, which fades to a brighter yellow in its final third or fourth. There are 5 moderately convex whorls, with the body whorl being very obtusely sub-angular in the anterior portion and becoming rounded toward its final segment; in mature shells, the body whorl descends noticeably to meet the aperture.

The spire's outlines are straight or show minimal tapering near the apex. The first whorl is smooth, followed by very fine, softly striate patterns on the second whorl. The last two whorls are finely and sharply striate, with the striae being irregular and unequal. The suture is distinct and well-defined.

== Distribution ==
This species is endemic to Hawaii, occurring on Kauai island.
