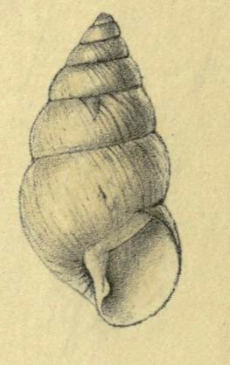
- Shell of Amastra conica

Scientific classification
- Kingdom: Animalia
- Phylum: Mollusca
- Class: Gastropoda
- Order: Stylommatophora
- Family: Amastridae
- Genus: Amastra
- Species: A. conica

Binomial name
- Amastra conica Baldwin, 1906

Synonyms
- Amastra (Amastrella) conica Baldwin, 1896 alternative representation

= Amastra conica =

Species of mollusc

Amastra conica is a species of air-breathing land snail, a terrestrial pulmonate gastropod mollusc in the family Amastridae.

Subspecies

- Amastra conica conica Baldwin, 1906
- Amastra conica gentilis C. M. Cooke, 1917
- Amastra conica gyrans Hyatt, 1911
- Amastra conica kohalensis Hyatt & Pilsbry, 1911

== Description ==
The length of the shell attains 15.5 mm, its diameter 8 mm.

(Later supplemental description by Hyatt, A. & Pilsbry, H. A.) The shell is a fossil specimen. It is dextral and minutely perforated, with a thin, elongately conical shape and an acute apex. Its surface is delicately sculpted with fine growth lines, while the apical whorls exhibit radiating sulcations. The original coloration of the living shell remains unknown. Comprising seven convex whorls, the shell features a well-defined suture. The aperture is oblique and oval, framed by a simple, very thin peristome. The columella ends in a subtly developed fold.

The species was discovered within deposits of fossilized shells at a location known as Mana. The likelihood of living specimens of this species persisting to the present day or within any recent period is exceedingly low.

== Distribution ==
This species is endemic to Hawaii, occurring on the Lanai island.
