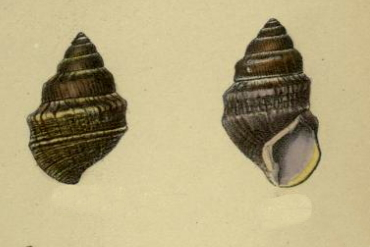
- Shell of Amastra knudsenii

Scientific classification
- Kingdom: Animalia
- Phylum: Mollusca
- Class: Gastropoda
- Order: Stylommatophora
- Family: Amastridae
- Genus: Amastra
- Species: A. knudsenii

Binomial name
- Amastra knudsenii (Baldwin, 1895)

Synonyms
- Achatinella (Amastra) knudsenii Baldwin, 1895 superseded combination; Amastra (Armiella) knudsenii (Baldwin, 1895) alternative representation; Armiella knudsenii (Baldwin, 1895) superseded combination

= Amastra knudsenii =

Species of mollusc

Amastra knudsenii is a species of air-breathing land snail, a terrestrial pulmonate gastropod mollusc in the family Amastridae.

== Description ==
The length of the shell attains 33 mm, its diameter 17 mm.

(Later supplemental description by Hyatt, A. & Pilsbry, H. A. ) The shell is imperforate, dextral, and oblong-conic, with a bicarinate structure. The first 3½ whorls form a slightly convex, conic embryonic shell. The initial whorl is smooth, while the second features curved vertical riblets. On the subsequent whorls, these riblets become irregular, often composed of two or more contiguous striae.

The first post-embryonic whorl exhibits coarse wrinkles, minute thread-like striae, and faint traces of spiral cords. The surface gradually becomes more convex and develops an angular shoulder above the midpoint of the whorl, with the area below this shoulder nearly vertical. From the fifth whorl onward, the shell shows characteristics of maturity, with more rapid expansion. The angular shoulder transitions into a pronounced keel, and on the body whorl, a second peripheral keel emerges, creating a concave space between the two. The base is convex, and the entire surface is intricately sculptured with spiral cords and striae.

The coloration is a purplish-red-brown, darker toward the apex and the base, with a pale border below the suture extending to the apex. Yellow markings adorn the carinae, cords, and folds of the body whorl, adding contrast.

The aperture is irregularly ovate and oblique, dark on the interior with a bluish-pearly luster. The outer lip is smoothly arcuate, with minimal modification by the carinae. The columella is short, concave above, and obliquely truncate at the base. It is covered with a flesh-tinted callus and bears a very oblique, thin spiral lamella.

The type specimen is a relatively thin shell, barely reaching full maturity. As the shell ages, it becomes notably thick and heavy. In gerontic (aged) specimens, the shell is exceptionally solid, with a thickened outer wall. The parietal wall is coated with a dense white callus, which bears a low, broad, conical prominence situated slightly within the aperture.

The columella is heavily encrusted with white callus, and its spiral lamella is thick, blunt, and only faintly distinguished from the basal truncation of the columellar pillar. The type specimen is deceased and nearly entirely stripped of its thin yellow cuticle.

== Distribution ==
This very rare species is endemic to Hawaii, occurring on Kauai Island.
