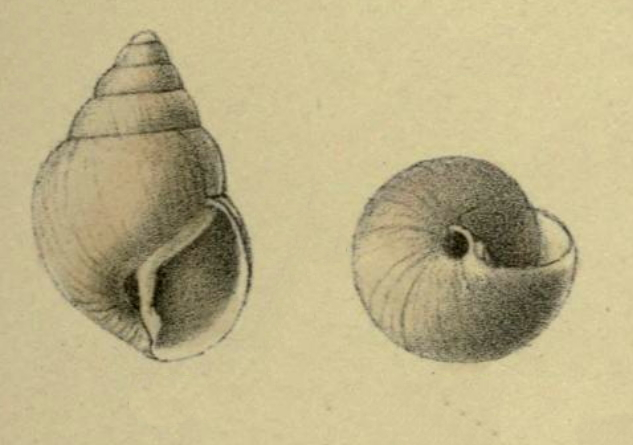
- Shell of Amastra similaris

Scientific classification
- Kingdom: Animalia
- Phylum: Mollusca
- Class: Gastropoda
- Order: Stylommatophora
- Family: Amastridae
- Genus: Amastra
- Species: A. similaris

Binomial name
- Amastra similaris Pease, 1870

Synonyms
- Amastra (Cyclamastra) similaris Pease, 1870 alternative representation; Amastra rugulosa var. similaris Pease, 1870 superseded rank

= Amastra similaris =

Species of mollusc

Amastra similaris is a species of air-breathing land snail, a terrestrial pulmonate gastropod mollusc in the family Amastridae.

== Description ==
The length of the shell attains 12.5 mm, its diameter 7.7 mm

The shell is umbilicate, ovate-conic, and moderately solid, with fine yet slightly rough and irregular striations on the body whorl. The spire is straightly conic, composed of 5½ moderately convex whorls. The whorls of the protoconch are smooth and distinctly convex.

The body whorl is compressed around the umbilicus and exhibits a spiral groove within its boundary. The aperture is angular at both the upper and lower ends. The outer lip is obtuse and slightly thickened on the interior. The columella is straight, forming a distinct angle with the basal lip, and features a retreating, oblique fold near its base.

The umbilicus is deep and well-like, contributing to the characteristic structure of the shell.

== Distribution ==
This species is endemic to Hawaii, occurring on Kauai island.
