= Armsia =

Scientific classification
- Kingdom: Animalia
- Phylum: Mollusca
- Class: Gastropoda
- Order: Stylommatophora
- Family: Amastridae
- Genus: Armsia

Genus of gastropods

Armsia is a genus of small, air-breathing, land snails, terrestrial pulmonate gastropod mollusks in the family Amastridae.

== Species ==
Species within the genus Armsia include:

- Armsia petasus
