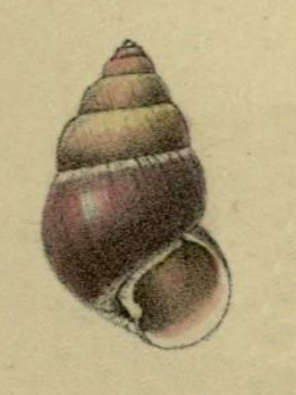
- Amastra nucleola shells

Scientific classification
- Kingdom: Animalia
- Phylum: Mollusca
- Class: Gastropoda
- Order: Stylommatophora
- Family: Amastridae
- Genus: Amastra
- Species: A. nucleola

Binomial name
- Amastra nucleola (Gould, 1845)

Synonyms
- Achatinella brevis L. Pfeiffer, 1846 junior subjective synonym; Achatinella nucleola A. Gould, 1845 superseded combination; Amastra (Amastrella) nucleola (A. Gould, 1845) alternative representation

= Amastra nucleola =

Species of gastropod

Amastra nucleola is a species of land snail, a terrestrial pulmonate gastropod mollusc in the family Amastridae.

== Description ==
The length of the shell attains 11¼ mm, its diameter 6¼ mm.

The shell is solid, imperforate, and ovate-globose in shape, with a livid chestnut coloration. The apex is pale, while areas near the suture and the anterior portion exhibit a whitish hue. It consists of six whorls, which are slightly tabulate posteriorly, adding a subtle angular appearance.

The aperture is rounded, with a simple lip that remains unadorned. The columella is excavated and covered by a callus, featuring a small but distinct fold. This combination of features gives the shell a sturdy yet refined character.

This is a small, solid species characterized by a livid hue, with the apex and the area near the suture displaying a pale, whitish tone. The shell transitions to a milk-white coloration near the termination of the body whorl at the aperture, adding a delicate contrast to its overall appearance.

== Distribution ==
This species is endemic to Hawaii, occurring on Oahu Island.
