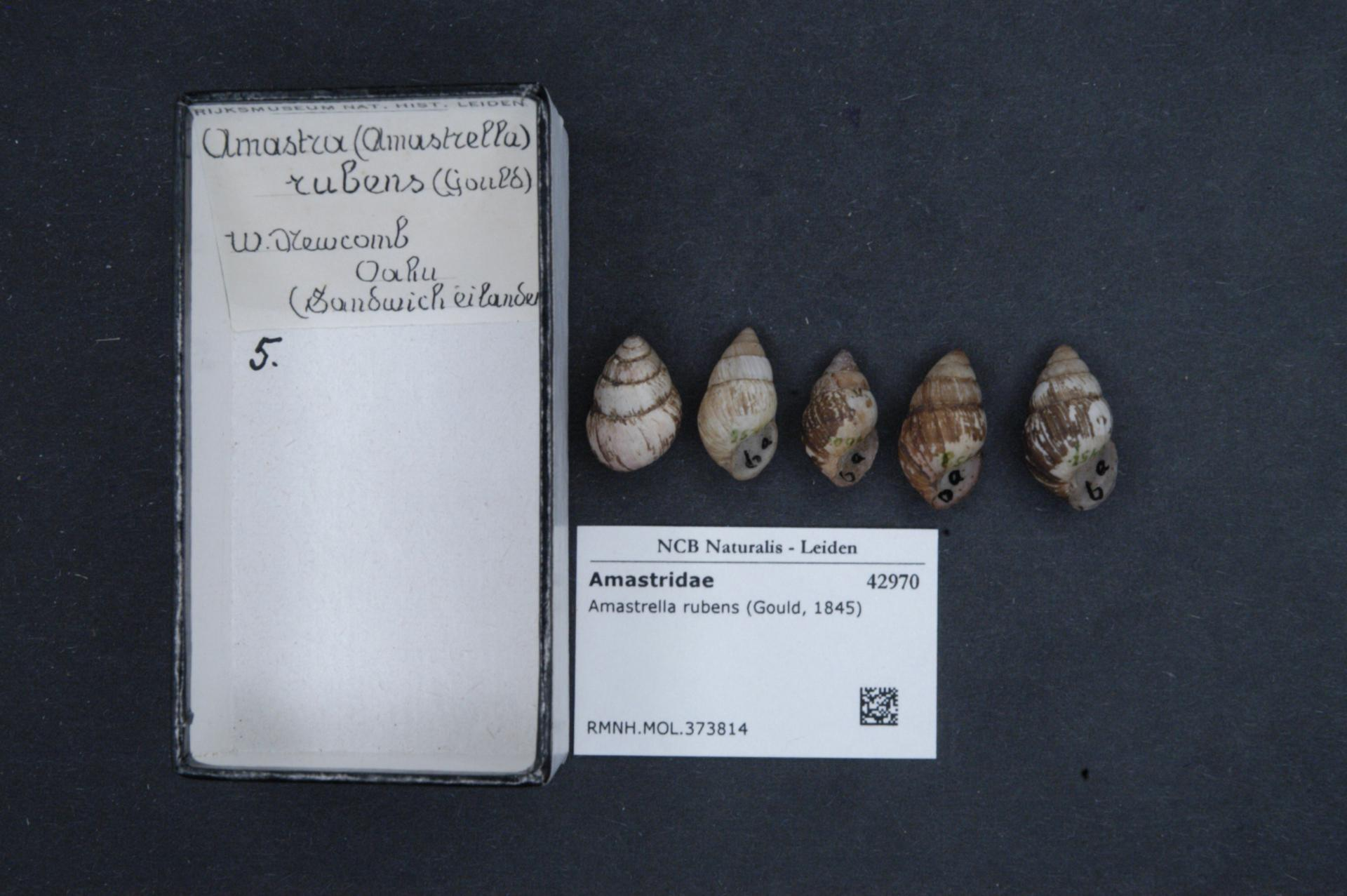
- Amastra rubens shells

Conservation status
- Critically Endangered (IUCN 2.3)

- Critically Imperiled (NatureServe)

Scientific classification
- Kingdom: Animalia
- Phylum: Mollusca
- Class: Gastropoda
- Order: Stylommatophora
- Family: Amastridae
- Genus: Amastra
- Species: A. rubens

Binomial name
- Amastra rubens (Gould, 1845)

Synonyms
- Achatinella rubens A. Gould, 1845 superseded combination; Amastra (Amastrella) rubens (A. Gould, 1845) alternative representation

= Amastra rubens =

Species of gastropod

Amastra rubens is a species of land snail, a terrestrial pulmonate gastropod mollusc in the Amastridae family.

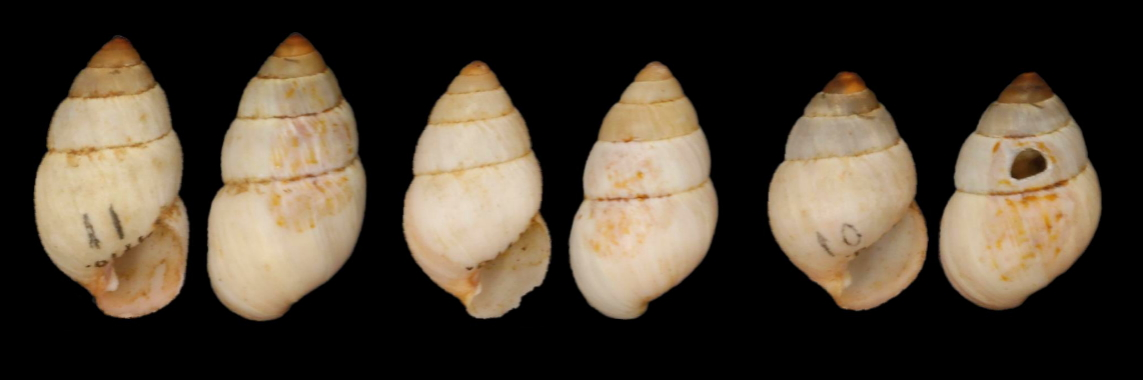
Amastra rubens rubinia - paralectotypes in the Smithsonian Institution

Subspecies

- Amastra rubens castanea Hyatt & Pilsbry, 1911
- Amastra rubens corneiformis Hyatt & Pilsbry, 1911
- Amastra rubens infelix Hyatt & Pilsbry, 1911
- Amastra rubens kahana Hyatt & Pilsbry, 1911
- Amastra rubens rubens (A. Gould, 1845)
- Amastra rubens rubinia Hyatt & Pilsbry, 1911

== Description ==
The length of the shell attains 19 mm, its diameter 9.1 mm.

The shell is elongate-ovate and robust, with a thick, straw-colored exterior. It is composed of 6 1/3 whorls. The apex is chestnut-toned, transitioning to a reddish hue at the anterior end. Comprising six convex whorls, the shell features an impressed suture and is sporadically covered with patches of brown epidermis. The ovate aperture is bordered by a simple lip, thickened internally and tinged with a roseate hue, while the throat is white. The columellar fold is thin, and the shell is imperforate. Although plain in form, the shell is notably distinguished by its coloration, particularly the vibrant tones of the aperture.

The first half-whorl of the shell is smooth, transitioning into extremely fine, sharp, closely spaced, and slightly arcuate longitudinal striae, which persist for the next two whorls. Following this, relatively coarse but low growth wrinkles begin to develop. The embryonic shell comprises nearly three whorls, characterized by a dark brown color, which appears purplish-brown when worn.

Subsequent spire whorls exhibit coarse wrinkles beneath the suture, leaving the remainder of the whorls and the entirety of the body whorl nearly smooth. The upper four or five whorls are reddish-brown, while the final one or two whorls are pale red-brown or whitish. These are covered by a thin, glossy, yellowish or flesh-tinted inner cuticle, which in turn is often overlain by a brown outer layer (ranging from blackish-brown to olivaceous-brown). This outer layer is typically worn off ventrally and may remain well-preserved, exist in shreds, or be almost entirely absent.

The interior of the basal and outer lips is typically rose-colored, though in some instances, it exhibits a bluish-white hue, adding a striking variation to the shell's appearance.

The animal is dark slate in color and approximately the same length as the shell. Its tentacles are black, while the underside of the foot and the mantle are brown. Highly timid by nature, it resides buried beneath leaves and other decaying vegetation, making it well-adapted to its concealed lifestyle.

== Distribution ==
This species is endemic to Hawaii, occurring on Oahu Island.
