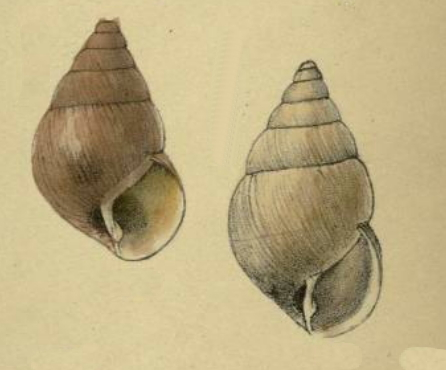
- Shell of Amastra morticina (holotype)

Scientific classification
- Kingdom: Animalia
- Phylum: Mollusca
- Class: Gastropoda
- Order: Stylommatophora
- Family: Amastridae
- Genus: Amastra
- Species: A. morticina

Binomial name
- Amastra morticina Hyatt & Pilsbry, 1911

Synonyms
- Amastra (Cyclamastra) morticina Hyatt & Pilsbry, 1911 alternative representation

= Amastra morticina =

Species of mollusc

Amastra morticina is a species of air-breathing land snail, a terrestrial pulmonate gastropod mollusc in the family Amastridae.

== Description ==
The length of the shell attains 10.9 mm, its diameter 6.5 mm.

(Original description) The shell contains 6 whorls. The shell is umbilicate and somewhat thin, with a globose body whorl. The spire is straightly conic, tapering slightly near the apex. It comprises six whorls: the whorls of the protoconch are smooth and convex, while the subsequent whorls are slightly convex and finely striate. The body whorl is inflated at the periphery and base, with weak plications near the suture, giving it an irregular appearance.

The deep umbilicus is bordered by an obtuse angle and contains a distinct spiral gutter within. The aperture is small, angular at the upper end, and subangular at the base of the columella. The outer lip is slightly thickened on the inner side, while the columellar lip is straight and only minimally dilated. A small, oblique columellar lamella completes the shell's delicate structure.

== Distribution ==
This species is endemic to Hawaii, occurring on Maui Island.
