= Leptachatina =

Scientific classification
- Kingdom: Animalia
- Phylum: Mollusca
- Class: Gastropoda
- Order: Stylommatophora
- Family: Amastridae
- Genus: Leptachatina; Gould, 1847

Synonyms
- Leptachatina (Thaanumia) Ancey, 1899

Genus of gastropods

Leptachatina is a genus of small air-breathing land snails, terrestrial pulmonate gastropod mollusks in the family Amastridae.

== Species ==
Species within the genus Leptachatina include:

- Leptachatina lepida
