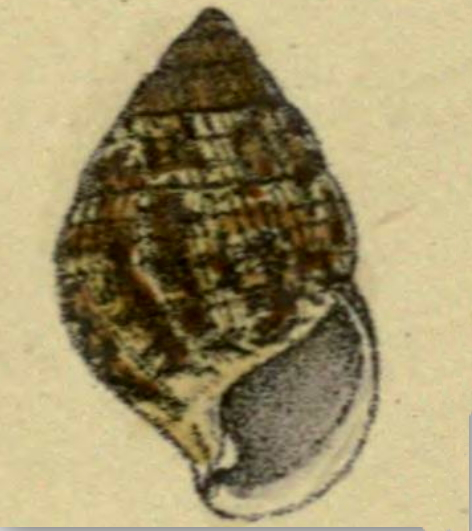
- Shell of Amastra undata

Scientific classification
- Kingdom: Animalia
- Phylum: Mollusca
- Class: Gastropoda
- Order: Stylommatophora
- Family: Amastridae
- Genus: Amastra
- Species: A. undata

Binomial name
- Amastra undata (Baldwin, 1895)

Synonyms
- Amastra (Metamastra) undata (Baldwin, 1895) alternative representation

= Amastra undata =

Species of mollusc

Amastra undata is a species of air-breathing land snail, a terrestrial pulmonate gastropod mollusc in the family Amastridae.

== Description ==
The length of the shell attains 17 mm, its diameter 12 mm.

(Later supplemental description by Hyatt, A. & Pilsbry, H. A. ) The shell contains six whorls. It is imperforate, globose-ovate, and moderately solid. It has a dark reddish-brown color, with broad, irregular light yellow stripes on the last two whorls. These stripes form a zigzag pattern below the periphery, blending together above it, and are preceded by scattered whitish spots and dashes on one or two earlier whorls. The spire is straightly conic, with slightly convex whorls. The shell of the protoconch is sharply and finely striate, while the later whorls are deeply and finely striate, with the striae intersected by several incised spiral lines in the peripheral region and above it.

The aperture is subvertical, with a flesh-colored interior and a white callous rim within the lip. The columellar fold is broad and subhorizontal.

== Distribution ==
This very rare species is endemic to Hawaii, occurring on Oahu Island.
