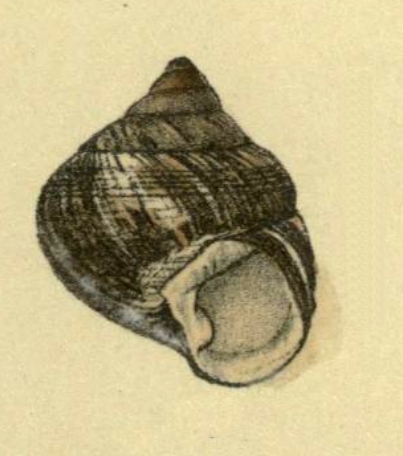
- Amastra obesa shell

Scientific classification
- Kingdom: Animalia
- Phylum: Mollusca
- Class: Gastropoda
- Order: Stylommatophora
- Family: Amastridae
- Genus: Amastra
- Species: A. obesa

Binomial name
- Amastra obesa Newcomb, 1853

Synonyms
- Achatinella (Laminella) obesa Newcomb, 1853 superseded combination; Achatinella obesa Newcomb, 1853 superseded combination; Amastra (Cyclamastra) obesa (Newcomb, 1853) alternative representation

= Amastra obesa =

Species of gastropod

Amastra obesa is a species of air-breathing land snails, terrestrial pulmonate gastropod mollusks in the family Amastridae.

Subspecies

- Amastra obesa aurora Pilsbry & C. M. Cooke, 1914
- Amastra obesa obesa (Newcomb, 1853)

== Description ==
The length of the shell attains 13 mm, its diameter 9.5 mm.

The shell is dextral, depressed-conical, and inflated, with a solid structure and pronounced striations. It is covered by a dark umber-colored epidermis. It is composed of five rounded whorls. The apex is acute, and the suture is simple yet distinctly defined.

The aperture is ovate and white, with the columella featuring a strong, prominent white plait. The outer lip is simple and slightly thickened on the inner side.

The shell is imperforate or faintly rimate, globose with a short, concavely conic spire, and relatively thin. It is pale brown beneath a dull chestnut or umber cuticle, which remains intact except near the aperture. The whorls of the protoconch, numbering about 2½, are convex and finely striated, with the last one being subtly angular and slightly perforate.

The subsequent whorls exhibit coarse, irregular wrinkles, with the body whorl rounded at the periphery and faintly adorned with shallow, coarse spiral striations. The aperture is small and oblique, white on the interior. The outer lip features a narrow internal rib. The columella is short, white, and adorned with an obtuse lamella.

The entire animal is a sooty black. The upper tentacles are prominently clubbed, while the lower tentacles have light-colored tips. The surface granulations are large and pronounced. The tentacles are longer than the shell. Its movements are notably slow and cautious, exuding a timid demeanor.

== Distribution ==
This species is endemic to Hawai, occurring on Molokai island.
