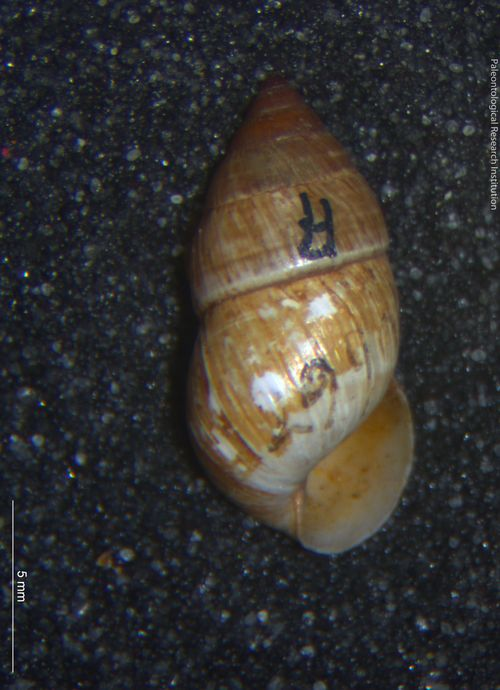
- Shell of Amastra affinis (specimen at the Paleontological Research Institution)

Scientific classification
- Kingdom: Animalia
- Phylum: Mollusca
- Class: Gastropoda
- Order: Stylommatophora
- Family: Amastridae
- Genus: Amastra
- Species: A. affinis

Binomial name
- Amastra affinis (Newcomb, 1854)

Synonyms
- Achatinella (Laminella) goniostoma L. Pfeiffer, 1855 junior subjective synonym; Achatinella affinis Newcomb, 1854 superseded combination; Achatinella pupoidea Newcomb, 1854 junior subjective synonym; Amastra (Amastra) affinis (Newcomb, 1854) alternative representation; Amastra (Amastra) affinis affinis (Newcomb, 1854); Amastra (Amastra) affinis pupoidea Newcomb, 1854; Amastra (Amastra) affinis subpulla Hyatt & Pilsbry, 1911 junior subjective synonym; Amastra (Amastra) affinis var. bigener Hyatt, 1911 junior subjective synonym; Amastra (Amastra) affinis var. cinderella Hyatt, 1911 junior subjective synonym; Amastra (Amastra) bigener Hyatt, 1911 alternative representation; Amastra (Amastra) bigener var. aberrans Hyatt, 1911 junior subjective synonym; Amastra affinis subpulla Hyatt & Pilsbry, 1911 junior subjective synonym; Amastra affinis var. bigener Hyatt, 1911 junior subjective synonym; Amastra bigener Hyatt, 1911 junior subjective synonym; Amastra bigener var. abberans Hyatt, 1911 junior subjective synonym; Amastra rustica Gulick, 1873 junior subjective synonym

= Amastra affinis =

Species of gastropod

Amastra affinis is a species of land snail, a terrestrial pulmonate gastropod mollusc in the family Amastridae.

Subspecies

- Amastra affinis kaupakaluana Hyatt & Pilsbry, 1911 (taxon inquirendum)
- Amastra affinis pupoidea (Newcomb, 1854) (taxon inquirendum)

== Description ==
(Original description) The shell is sharply conical, composed of six rounded, non-margined whorls with a well-defined suture. The aperture is ovate, with a thin outer lip. The columella features a white, lamellar, twisted tooth.

The shell is predominantly white, roseate, or salmon in color, often retaining traces of a dark brown epidermis. The body whorl is noticeably lighter in color compared to the upper ones.

== Distribution ==
This species is endemic to Hawaii and occurs on Maui Island.
