= César Marie Félix Ancey =

French conchologist and entomologist

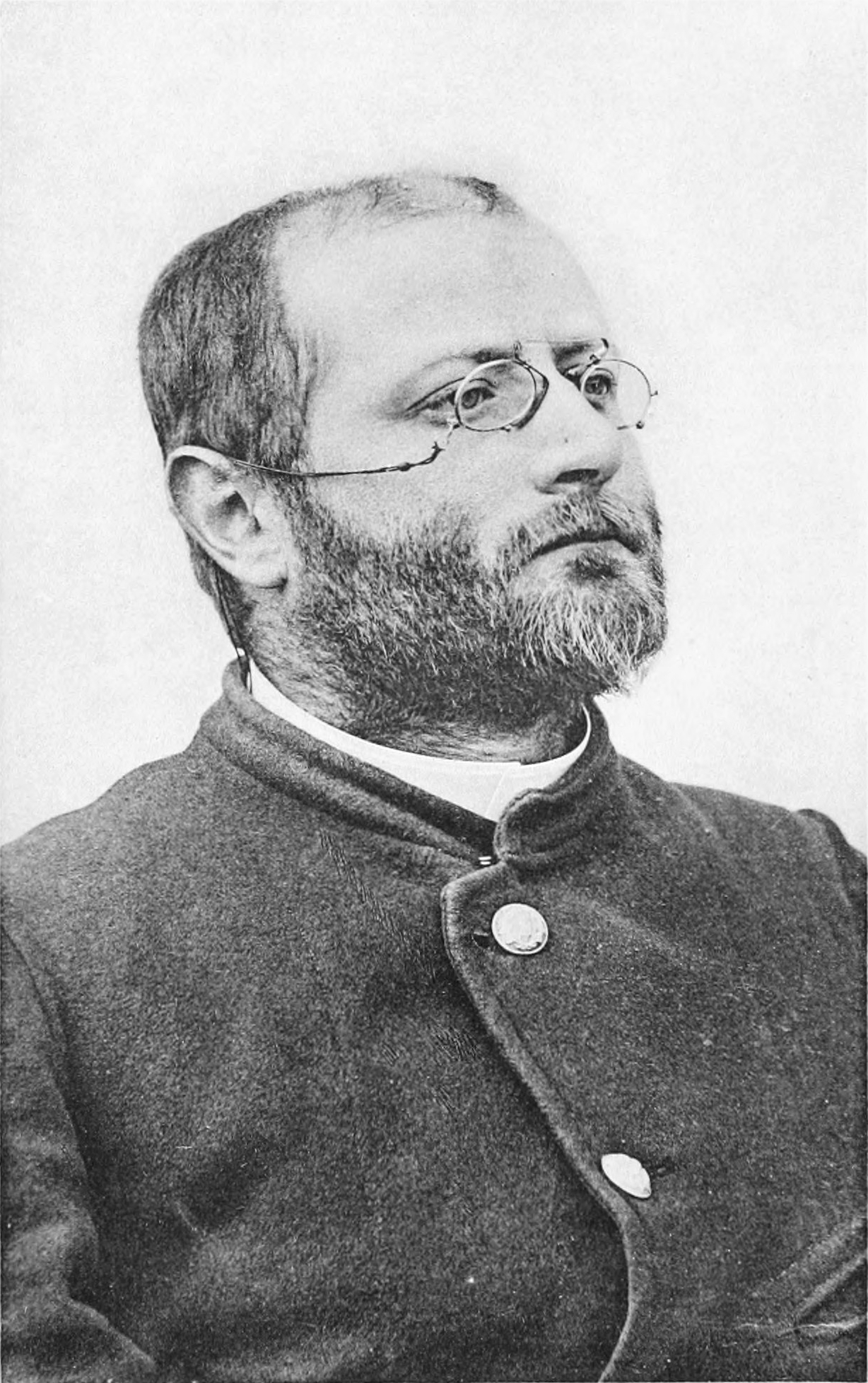
- César Marie Félix Ancey
- Born: 15 November 1860; Marseille, France
- Died: 10 October 1906 (aged 45); Mascara, Algeria
- Scientific career
- Fields: conchology

César Marie Félix Ancey (15 November 1860 – 10 October 1906) was a French conchologist and entomologist.

For 23 years Ancey was 'conservateur' of collections for Charles Oberthür (1845–1924) at Rennes. Ancey was then a 'fonctionnaire' at Mascara until his death.

The genus Anceya was dedicated to him by Jules René Bourguignat.

== Biography ==
César Marie Félix Ancey, administrator at Mascara, Algeria, was born in Marseille, France, 15 November 1860. His father, well known for his publications on entomology and author of valuable work on malacology, encouraged his well-developed inclination for zoological studies. At the age of twenty-three he was appointed conservator of the fine Oberthur entomological collection at Rennes. This position not promising material success, he returned to Marseille, where he studied law, and obtained his diploma in 1885. He then entered the government administration in Algeria. He was married in 1889, and the same year was appointed deputy administrator, and filled successively positions at Fort National, Boghari and Dra-el Mizan. After thirteen years spent in that locality he was promoted to acting administrator at Mascara. It was a just reward for his great qualifications and for the esteem which he had been able to win amidst duties that were frequently of a difficult character.

Mr. Ancey hoped shortly to fill a State mission to the Cape Verde Islands, which was sure to furnish opportunities for malacological studies. After a brief illness he died at Mascara, Algeria, 10 October 1906. His death was a painful surprise to his scientific correspondents.

== Bibliography ==
Most of his writings were on conchology, and his many papers, some 140 in all, give an idea of the importance of his work, devoted principally to the malacological fauna of Hawaii, Central Africa, Polynesia, Central Asia, etc. He was especially interested in the study of the smaller land shells, of which he had a large collection. As his appointment to Mascara promised to be permanent, he expected to be able to work up his large accumulation of undetermined species, still packed just as he had received them. It was his purpose some day to study the land mollusks of Algeria; although thoroughly competent for the work, he hesitated to undertake it on account of the difficulties arising from the many doubtful species, which made the study of the Algerian fauna a most ungrateful task.

- Ancey C. F. (1881). "Unio gladiatorm n. sp." Le Naturaliste 3: 468.
- Ancey C. F. et al. (1886). "Ancey, César-Marie-Félix". Revue Biographique de la Société Malacologique de France 2: 11–25.
- Ancey C.-F. (1888). "Mollusques du Haut-Tonkin (Récoltes de M. Villedary)". Le Naturaliste: journal des échanges et des nouvelles 2(10): 70–72.
- Ancey C. F. (1888). "On the generic name of a remarkable bivalve shell found in the Congo". The Conchologists' Exchange 2(2): 22.
- Ancey C. F. (1888). Bull. Soc. Malac. Fr. v. p., 192.
- (in French) Ancey C. F. (1893). "Faunes malacologiques de l'Afghanistan et du Beloutchistan". Bulletin de la Société Zoologique de France 18: 40–47.
- (in French) Ancey C. F. (1894). "Resultat des researches malacologiques de Mgr. Lechaptois sur les bords du lac Nyassa et de la riviere Shiré". Mém. Soc. Zool. de France 7: 217–234.
- Ancey C. F. (1897). "Viaggio del Dott. A. Borelli nel Chaco Boliviano e nella Rep. Argentina. Resultas malacologiques". Bol. Mus. Zool. Anat. Comp. (Torino) 12(309): 1-22 + 1 plate.
- Ancey C. F. (1900). "Description of new species of Asiatic shells". The Nautilus 14(7): 83-84.
- Ancey C. F. (1905). "Remarks on some land and fresh-water shells from the New Hebrides, with description of new species". The Nautilus 19(4): 42-46.
- Ancey C. F. (1906). "Descriptions of two new Cleopatra and a Pisidium". The Nautilus 20(4): 45-46.
- Ancey C. F. (1906). "Réflexions sur la Faune Malacologique du Lac Tanganika et Catalogue des Mollusques de ce Lac". Bulletin Scientifique de la France et de la Belgique 40: 229-270.

== Taxa described ==
Ancey is the authority for many generic or subgeneric names, among which may be mentioned: Boysidia, Parabalia, Haplotrema, Pseudomphalus, Monomphalus, Micromphalia, Platystoma, Rhytidiopsis, Pararhytida, Microphyura, Ochroderma, Tomostele (subgenus), Mabilliella, Thomsonia, Lechaptoisia, Thaanumia, Baldwinia and Armandiella.
