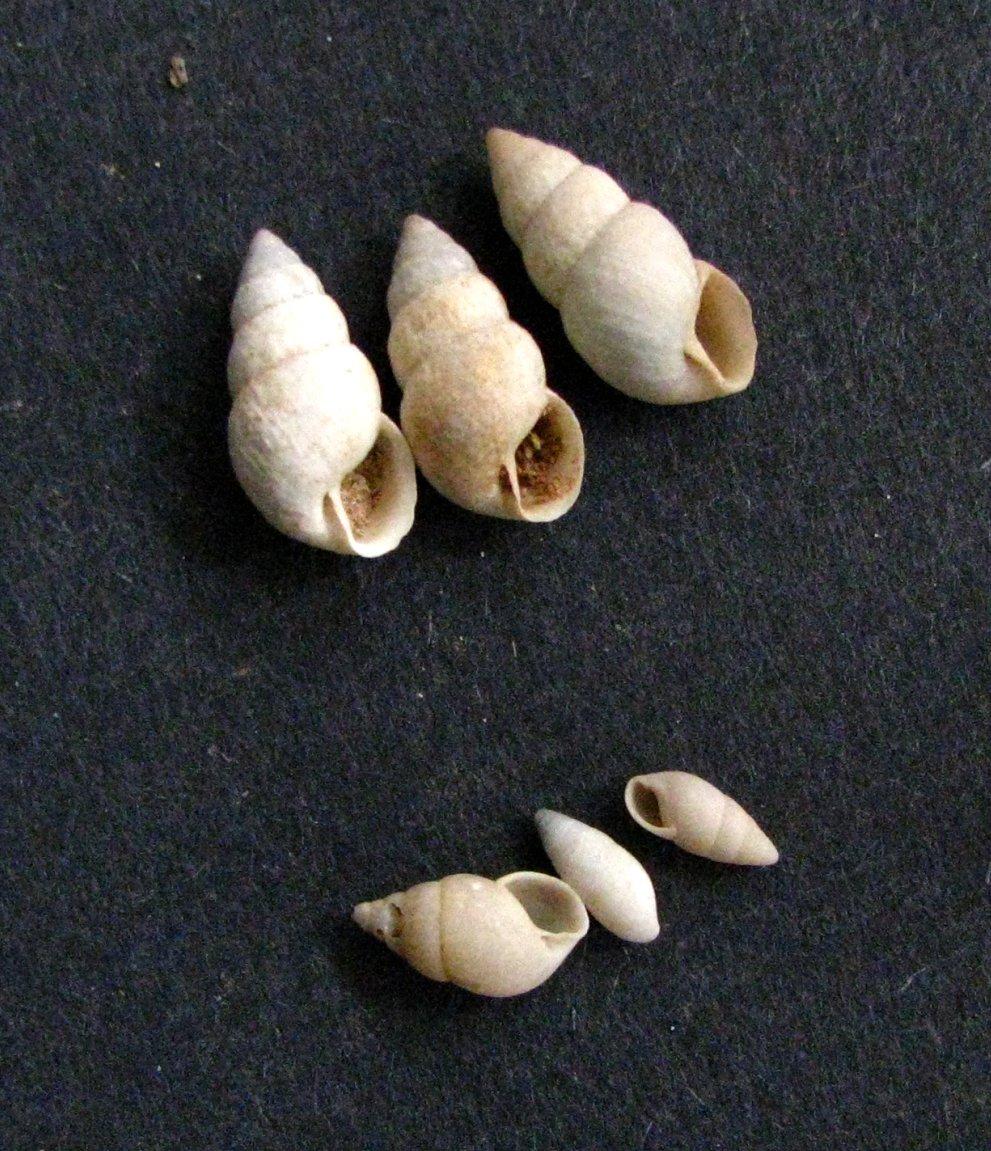
- Shells of Amastra sp. (top) and Leptachatina sp. (bottom)

Scientific classification
- Kingdom: Animalia
- Phylum: Mollusca
- Class: Gastropoda
- Order: Stylommatophora
- Suborder: Helicina
- Infraorder: Pupilloidei
- Superfamily: Pupilloidea
- Family: Amastridae; Pilsbry, 1910

= Amastridae =

Family of gastropods

Amastridae is a taxonomic family of small, air-breathing, land snails, terrestrial pulmonate gastropod mollusks in the superfamily Pupilloidea.

== Distribution ==
This family is endemic to the Hawaiian Islands.

== Genera ==
Subfamily Amastrinae Pilsbry, 1910

- Amastra H. Adams & A. Adams, 1855
- Carelia H. Adams & A. Adams, 1855
- Cyclamastra Pilsbry & Vanatta, 1905 : synonym of Amastra (Cyclamastra) Pilsbry & Vanatta, 1905 represented as Amastra H. Adams & A. Adams, 1855
- Kauaia Sykes, 1900: synonym of Amastra (Kauaia) Sykes, 1900 represented as Amastra H. Adams & A. Adams, 1855 (unaccepted rank)
- Laminella L. Pfeiffer, 1854
- Planamastra Hyatt & Pilsbry, 1911
- Tropidoptera Ancey, 1889

Subfamily Leptachatininae Cockerell, 1913

- Armsia Hyatt & Pilsbry, 1911
- Leptachatina A. A. Gould, 1847
- Pauahia C. M. Cooke, 1910

Genera brought into synonymy

- Carinella L. Pfeiffer, 1875: synonym of Amastra (Kauaia) Sykes, 1900 represented as Amastra H. Adams & A. Adams, 1855
- Helicamastra Pilsbry & Vanatta, 1905: synonym of Tropidoptera Ancey, 1889
- Pterodiscus Pilsbry, 1893: synonym of Tropidoptera Ancey, 1889
