= Gulick =

Gulick is a surname, originally of Dutch origin, as 'van Gulick', referring to Jülich in Germany. Notable people with the surname include:

- Alice Gordon Gulick (1847-1903), American missionary and educator
- Amy Gulick, American photographer
- Bill Gulick (1916–2013), American writer and historian
- Charles T. Gulick (1841–1897), Hawaiian Kingdom politician
- Denny Gulick, American mathematician
- Esther Gulick (1911–1995), American environmentalist
- Frances Gulick (1891–1936), American YMCA worker
- J. T. Gulick (1832–1923), American missionary and naturalist
- Luther Gulick (disambiguation), multiple people
- Merle Gulick (1906–1976), American football player
- Peter Johnson Gulick (1796–1877), American missionary
- Sidney Gulick (1860–1945), American missionary
- William Gulick (1814–1904), American physician and politician

== See also ==
- Van Gulik
