= Alice Walbridge Gulick =

American teacher, hospital matron, and Christian missionary

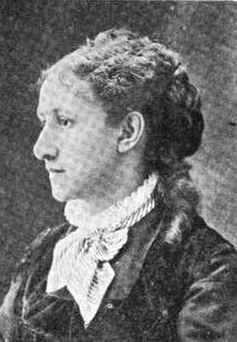
Alice E. Wallbridge Gulick, from a 1911 publication.

Alice Elmira Walbridge Gulick (February 21, 1843 — January 19, 1911), was an American teacher, hospital matron, and Christian missionary affiliated with the American Board of Commissioners for Foreign Missions (ABCFM).

== Early life ==
Alice Elmira Walbridge was born in Ithaca, New York, the daughter of Henry Sanford Walbridge, a judge and Congressman, and his second wife, Fanny Thompson Walbridge. As a young woman, she trained and worked in Chicago as a school teacher.

== Career ==
Alice E. W. Gulick accompanied her husband on missionary assignments from the American Board of Commissioners for Foreign Missions, first in Santander, Spain from 1873 to 1875, and in Zaragoza from 1875 to 1883. They had further stints in Cuba, Nevada, and New Mexico in the 1870s and 1880s. They were based in Paia, Hawaii from 1886 to 1892, and in Philadelphia from 1893 until 1903. In the last location, Alice Walbridge Gulick was matron at the Presbyterian Hospital's Home for Convalescents and Home for Incurables, in Devon, Pennsylvania. "She was a sweet singer, fond of literature and poetry, vivacious and interesting in conversation, and a woman of strong will coupled with remarkable sweetness of temper," recalled one obituary.

While in the United States, Gulick spoke at the annual meeting of the New Haven Branch of the Woman's Board of Missions in 1883. In 1894, she wrote an essay about the Hawaiian Islands for The Review of Reviews.

== Personal life ==
In 1872, Alice E. Walbridge married Rev. Thomas Lafon Gulick, the son of missionaries Peter Johnson Gulick and Fanny Hinckley Thomas Gulick. His was a large family of missionaries, including naturalist J. T. Gulick, educator Alice Gordon Gulick, physicians Luther Halsey Gulick Sr. and Luther Gulick Jr., and educator Sidney Gulick.

Alice E. W. Gulick was widowed when Thomas died in Kenya in 1904. She retired from her work in 1908, returned to Hawaii in 1909, and she died there in 1911, aged 67 years. Her grave is with her husband's family's graves, in the Kawaiahaʻo Church cemetery in Honolulu, Hawaii.
