= Luther Gulick =

Luther Gulick is the name of:

- Luther Gulick (physician) (1865–1918), American physical education instructor, international basketball official, and founder of the Camp Fire Girls
- Luther Gulick (social scientist) (1892–1993), scholar of public administration
- Luther Halsey Gulick, Sr. (1828–1891), missionary who was father and grandfather of above
