= Alice Gulick =

Alice Gulick may refer to:

- Alice Gordon Gulick, American missionary teacher in Spain
- Alice Walbridge Gulick, American teacher, hospital matron, and Christian missionary
