= Gullick =

Gullick is a surname, and may refer to:

- Donald Gullick (1924 – 2000), a Welsh rugby footballer
- J. M. Gullick (1916 – 2012), a British orientalist
- Luke Gullick (born 1987), an English footballer
- William Gullick (1858 – 1922), an Australian printer and graphic artist
- Tom Gullick (1931 -- 2023), English tour operator, champion birdwatcher and conservationist

== See also ==
- Gulick
- Jülich Gullick is a Dutch spelling of Jülich.
