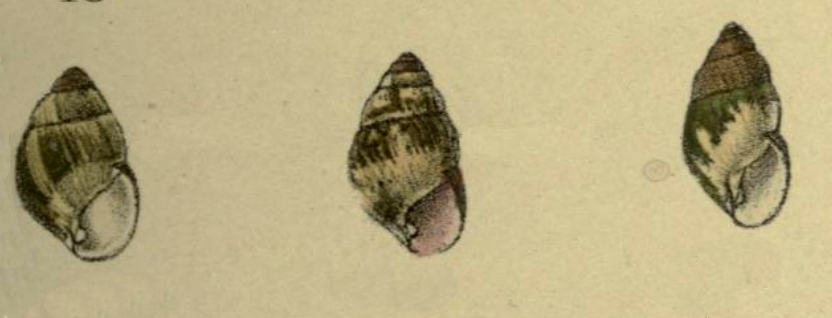
- Shells of Amastra elliptica

Scientific classification
- Kingdom: Animalia
- Phylum: Mollusca
- Class: Gastropoda
- Order: Stylommatophora
- Family: Amastridae
- Genus: Amastra
- Species: A. elliptica

Binomial name
- Amastra elliptica Gulick, 1873

Synonyms
- Amastra (Amastrella) elliptica E. A. C. M. Cooke, 1908 alternative representation

= Amastra elliptica =

Species of mollusc

Amastra elliptica is a species of air-breathing land snail, a terrestrial pulmonate gastropod mollusc in the family Amastridae.

== Description ==
The length of the shell attains 15 mm, its diameter 8.5 mm

The shell is dextral, ovate, and slightly glossy, with faint growth lines. It contains 5½, convex whorls with the first 4½ brownish-corneous and the body whorl paler. The shell is partially coated with a dark olive-colored epidermis, which is worn away in some areas at the front of the body whorl. The spire is somewhat turreted, with a simple suture. The aperture is white, occasionally tinged rose-pink at the front, and sometimes entirely white. The peristome is thin and only slightly thickened internally. The columella is gracefully arcuate, with the lip ends connected by a thin callus and bearing a compressed, subbasal tooth

Amastra elliptica is distinguished from Amastra decorticata and its allies by the well-developed outer epidermal layer. On the anterior surface of the body whorl, the epidermis is light olive-brown with numerous uneven blackish streaks. On the posterior surface, these streaks merge to form a more or less continuous black area covering approximately the last quarter of the body whorl. The underlying cuticle, exposed near the aperture where the outer layer has worn off, is pale yellow. In deceased specimens where the entire cuticle has eroded, the spire takes on a reddish hue, while the last whorl remains white.

== Distribution ==
This species is endemic to Hawaii, occurring on Oahu island.
