= Partulina induta =

- Shell of Partulina induta

Scientific classification
- Kingdom: Animalia
- Phylum: Mollusca
- Class: Gastropoda
- Order: Stylommatophora
- Family: Achatinellidae
- Genus: Partulina
- Species: P. induta

Binomial name
- Partulina induta (Gulick, 1856)

Synonyms
- Achatinella induta Gulick, 1856 superseded combination; Partulina (Partulina) induta (Gulick, 1856) alternative representation

Species of gastropod

Partulina induta is a species of land snail in the family Achatinellidae.

Subspecies

- Partulina induta induta (Gulick, 1856)
- Partulina induta kaaeana D. D. Baldwin, 1906

== Description ==
The shell measures 0.83 inches (21 mm) in length and 0.50 inches (12.5 mm) in diameter, with the aperture itself reaching a length of 0.40 inches (10 mm).

(Original description) The shell is dextral and shaped into a solid, conic-ovate form. It features a perforated base and a brown, unpolished surface that, upon microscopic inspection, reveals very minute and nearly obsolete decussated patterns. The apex is subacute and beautifully tessellated with alternating patches of white and chestnut.

The spire is convexly conical, leading down to a suture that is lightly impressed but lacks a margin. There are six whorls in total, each being slightly convex; the body whorl is particularly dominant, accounting for 75–77% of the shell's entire length. Within the aperture, the columellar fold is strong, white, and set at a nearly transverse angle.

The aperture is slightly oblique and shaped into a sinuous oval, displaying a bluish-white interior. The peristome is thickened within, and its anterior margin is slightly reflected. The columellar margin is dilated, white, and remains unattached to the body, while the parietal margin is either very thin or entirely wanting.

== Distribution ==
This species is endemic to Maui Island, Hawaii in the United States.
