= Fanny Gulick =

American missionary (1798–1883)

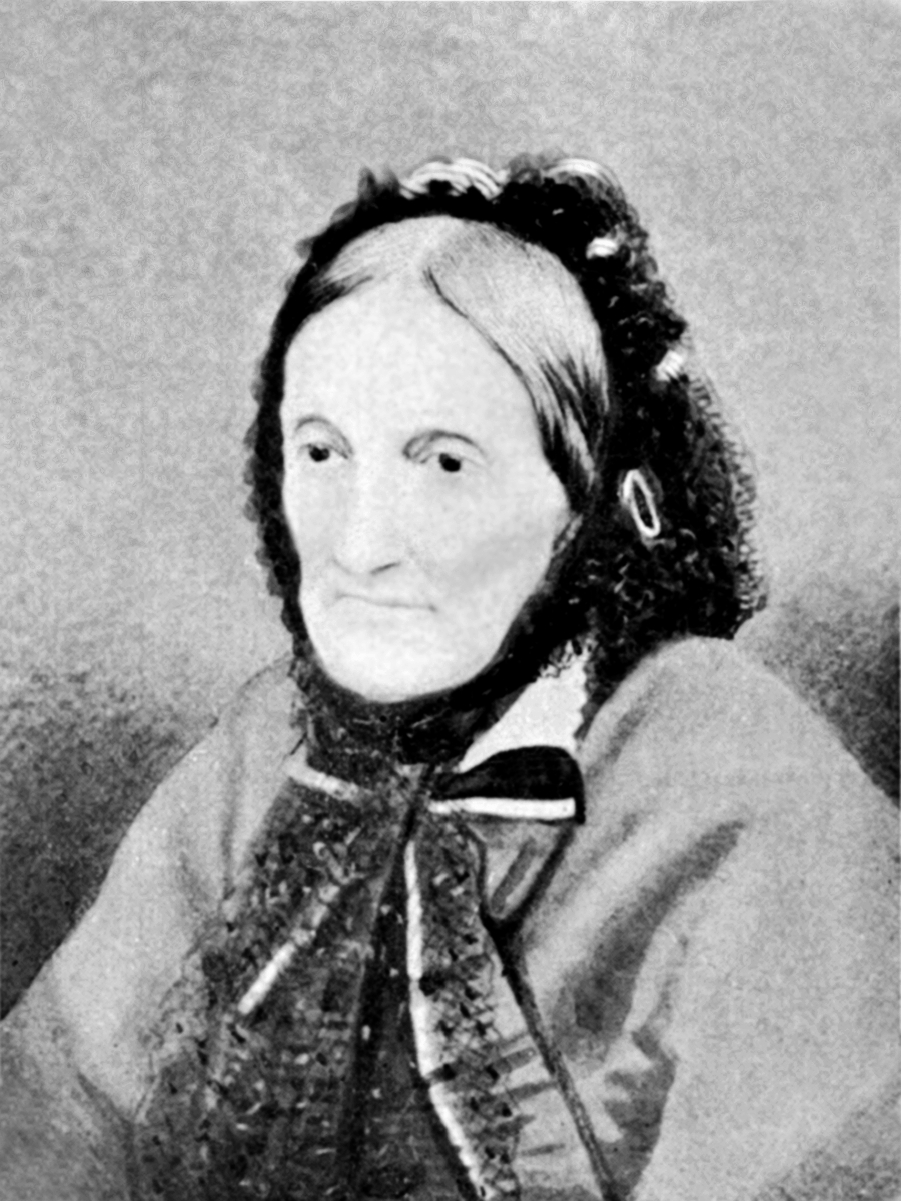
- Fanny Hinckley Thomas Gulick (ca. 1876)

Personal life
- Born: Frances Hinckley Thomas; April 16, 1798 Lebanon, Connecticut, U.S.
- Died: May 25, 1883 (aged 85) Kobe, Japan
- Spouse: Peter Johnson Gulick
- Children: 8, including Luther and John
- Relatives: Alice Walbridge Gulick (daughter-in-law); Sidney Gulick (grandson); Luther Gulick (grandson); Luther Gulick (great-grandson); Frances Gulick (great-granddaughter); Denny Gulick (great-great grandson)

Religious life
- Religion: Presbyterian
- Profession: Missionary

Fanny Gulick (born Frances Hinckley Thomas; April 16, 1798 – May 24, 1883) was an American Presbyterian missionary to the Hawaiian Kingdom and to Japan. Fanny and her husband, Rev. Peter Johnson Gulick had eight children, seven of whom also became missionaries. She was the first to instruct the island women in plaiting the straw-like covering of the sugarcane blossom into materials for hats and bonnets — an industry that soon became an important one.

== Early life and education ==
Frances Hinckley Thomas was born on April 16, 1798, in Lebanon, Connecticut, on Goshen Hill. Her parents were John Thomas (1775–1814) and Elizabeth "Betsy" Hinckley (1774–1811). Fanny's siblings were: Elihu (b. 1792), Charles (b. 1798), and Eliza (b. 1804).

In 1825, Gulick put herself under the preaching of Mr. Finney, at Utica, New York, and was converted, though not with several attendant circumstances narrated in Mr. Finney's Autobiography, there having evidently been some confusion in his remembrance of the events.

== Career ==
Having been united in marriage with the Rev. Peter Johnson Gulick on September 5, 1827, they sailed from Boston in November 1827, for the Hawaiian Islands, with the fourth company of missionaries to that group.

She brought up a family of seven sons and one daughter, six of whom served in foreign missionary service. Having been engaged in Sunday schools in New York City, among the very earliest of those efforts in the U.S., she took to her remote field among the islanders many of the methods then so novel. She accomplished much indirect missionary work. Early on, she taught the native women how to sew and make simple apparel for themselves and their families. She was the first to instruct them in plaiting the straw-like covering of the sugarcane blossom into materials for hats and bonnets — an industry that soon became an important one.

Gulick struggled with feeble health for more than half a century. In 1872, their active career having finished, Mr. and Mrs. Gulick removed from the Sandwich Islands to Japan, to spend their remaining days with their missionary children in Kobe. They touched at San Francisco on their way to Japan, but did not visit the home of their youth in the Eastern United States, which they had left in 1827, and which they never revisited. Mr. Gulick died a few weeks after celebrating the couple's missionary semi-centennial.

== Descendants ==
- Son Luther Halsey Gulick was born in Honolulu on June 10, 1828, married Louisa Lewis October 29, 1850, and became a missionary physician. He died on April 8, 1891, in Springfield, Massachusetts.
  - Their son Sidney Lewis Gulick (1860–1945) was a minister in Japan and educator in the US. Sidney's son, also named Luther Halsey Gulick (1892–1993), was a social scientist.
  - Luther and Louisa's son Luther Halsey Gulick Jr. (1865–1918) was a physician who founded Camp Fire Girls. He supervised the development of the game of basketball. Luther Jr.'s daughter Frances Gulick (1891–1936) operated a canteen for servicemen near the front lines of World War I.

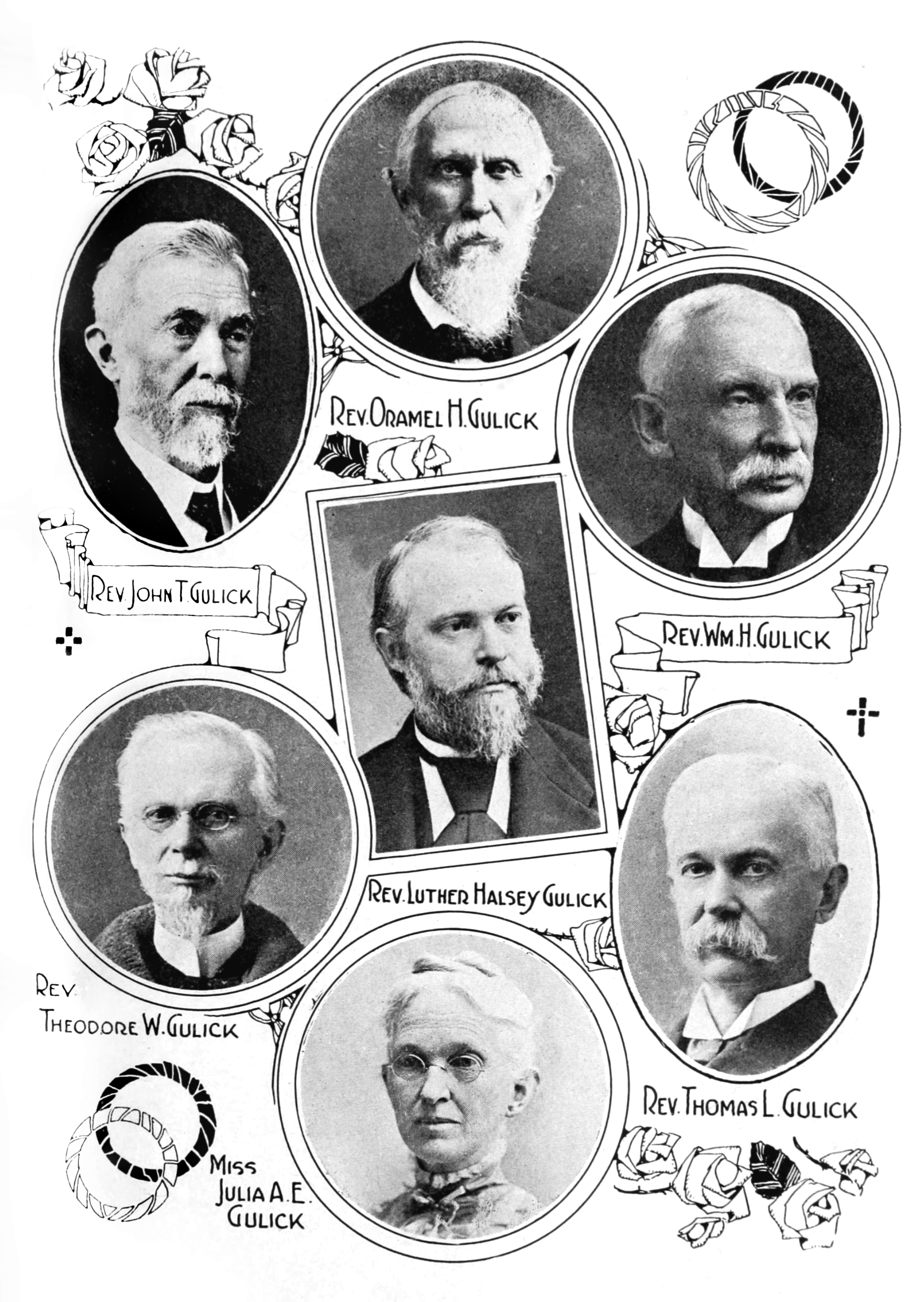
The seven surviving children all became missionaries

- Son Orramel Hinckley Gulick was born in Honolulu October 7, 1830, married Ann Eliza Clark (1833–1938), daughter of missionary Ephraim Weston Clark (1799–1878). He served as a missionary to Japan, and returned to Hawaii, where he died September 18, 1923. They published a history of the missions in 1918.
- Son John Thomas Gulick was born March 13, 1832, on Kauaʻi, became a missionary and biologist and died April 14, 1923. He exchanged ideas on some of the early theories of evolution with Charles Darwin.
- Son Charles Finney Gulick was born April 10, 1834, in Honolulu. He died January 18, 1854, in Glenhaven, New York, before he could attend college.
- Son William Hooker Gulick was born November 18, 1835, on Kauaʻi. He first traveled to Venezuela and Colombia. He married Alice Gordon Kitteredge December 12, 1871, and became a missionary to Spain that year. They founded Instituto Internacional in Madrid as a school for girls in 1892. He moved to Boston in 1919 where he died April 14, 1922.
- Son Theodore Weld Gulick was born May 8, 1837 (named for Theodore Dwight Weld), married Mary Agnes Thompson in 1867. He trained as a dentist, but became a missionary to various places from Kyoto, Japan to Milwaukee, Wisconsin. He died April 7, 1924, in Long Beach, California.
  - Their son Walter Vose Gulick, (April 14, 1870 – February 10, 1922) became a physician and author in Washington state.
- Son Thomas Lafron Gulick was born April 10, 1839, married Alice E. Walbridge (1843–1911) in 1872, and joined his brother William in Spain in 1873. In 1883 they left Spain and worked in Cuba, Las Vegas, Nevada; and New Mexico. They returned to Hawaii in 1886, where he was pastor of Makawao Union Church 1887–1892. In 1893 they moved to Philadelphia, where she was matron and he chaplain at the Penn Presbyterian Medical Center. On an expedition with Samuel Thomas Alexander and Annie Montague Alexander to Africa, Thomas died on August 15, 1904, in Kijabe, Kenya.
- Daughter Julia Ann Eliza Gulick was born June 5, 1845, and moved with her parents to live with Orramel in Kobe in 1874. She worked as a missionary there, until returning to Honolulu and working with Japanese people in Hawaii; she died in 1936.

Julia, Orramel, John and Sidney are buried in the Mission House cemetery at Kawaiahaʻo Church. Since Julia had not yet been born when her brother Luther Halsey Gulick left for the United States in 1840, the family never was all together in the same place at one time.

All the children except Luther graduated from Punahou School Luther Gulick served as a trustee from 1865 to 1870.

=== Family tree ===
Gulick family tree

Peter Johnson Gulick (1796–1877)	Fanny Hinckley Thomas (1798–1883)
Luther Halsey Gulick Sr. (1828–1891)	Orramel Hinckley Gulick (1830–1923)	John Thomas Gulick (1832–1923)	William Hooker Gulick (1835–1922)
Theodore Weld Gulick (1837–1924)
Thomas Lafron Gulick (1839–1904)
Sarah Frances Gulick (1854–1937)	Sidney Gulick (1860–1945)	Luther Gulick (1865–1918)
Luther Halsey Gulick (1892–1993)	Sidney Lewis Gulick Jr. (1902–1988)	Frances Jewett Gulick (1891–1936)
Denny Gulick

== Death ==
She had been very feeble for several preceding months, and during April, having completed her eighty-fifth year, her physical powers failed rapidly, though her mental faculties remained unclouded to the last. She arranged all her business and delivered all her messages to her family and to the native Christians of Japan. She died on May 24, 1883, aged 85, in Kobe, Japan.
