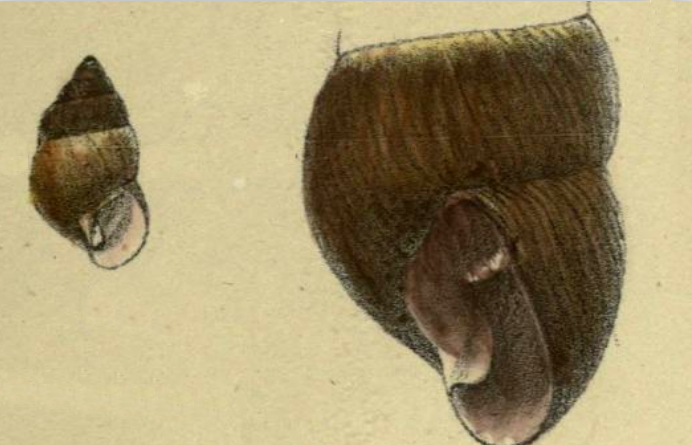
- Shell of Amastra decorticata

Scientific classification
- Kingdom: Animalia
- Phylum: Mollusca
- Class: Gastropoda
- Order: Stylommatophora
- Family: Amastridae
- Genus: Amastra
- Species: A. decorticata

Binomial name
- Amastra decorticata Gulick, 1873

Synonyms
- Achatinella decorticata Baldwin, 1893; Amastra (Amastrella) decorticata E. A. C. M. Cooke, 1908 alternative representation; Laminella decorticata GuLick, W. G. Binney, 1884

= Amastra decorticata =

Species of mollusc

Amastra decorticata is a species of air-breathing land snail, a terrestrial pulmonate gastropod mollusc in the family Amastridae.

== Description ==
The length of the shell attains 16 mm, its diameter 8.5 mm

The shell is ovate-conic, dextral, and lightly striated with growth lines. Its coloration is chestnut, becoming blackish near the lip. There are 6 to 6½ whorls, which are slightly convex, with the first three being polished. The suture is simple and pale.

The aperture is weakly colored, with a dirty-blue interior. The peristome is thin, blackish on the inside, and only slightly thickened. The columellar fold is thin and delicate.

The shell lacks the conspicuously patched appearance typical of Amastra inflata and Amastra elliptica. However, under magnification, some small, dull streaks may be observed on its otherwise glossy surface, which generally lacks an epidermis in the typical form. Its coloration is a reddish-chestnut of varying intensity, often shading into yellowish tones on the upper part of the body whorl and consistently darker near the lip. The spire is often a deeper purplish-brown.

The suture is sometimes marked by a yellowish line, though this feature is not always present. The shell exhibits 2½ whorls in the protoconch, with the last one being very lightly, minutely, and unevenly striated. Subsequent whorls show rather coarse, low, and uneven wrinkles, making the surface rougher and less glossy compared to A. textilis.

The spire's outline contracts slightly near the summit, but the penultimate whorl noticeably bulges, particularly when viewed from the back. The axis is typically perforated, although in some narrower shells, the crevice may be nearly or entirely closed. A few older specimens feature a white callous nodule on the parietal wall, covered thinly by a semi-transparent or dirty-white film that is especially delicate at the outer edge.

== Distribution ==
This species is endemic to Hawaii, occurring on Oahu island.
