= Peter Johnson Gulick =

American missionary (1796–1877)

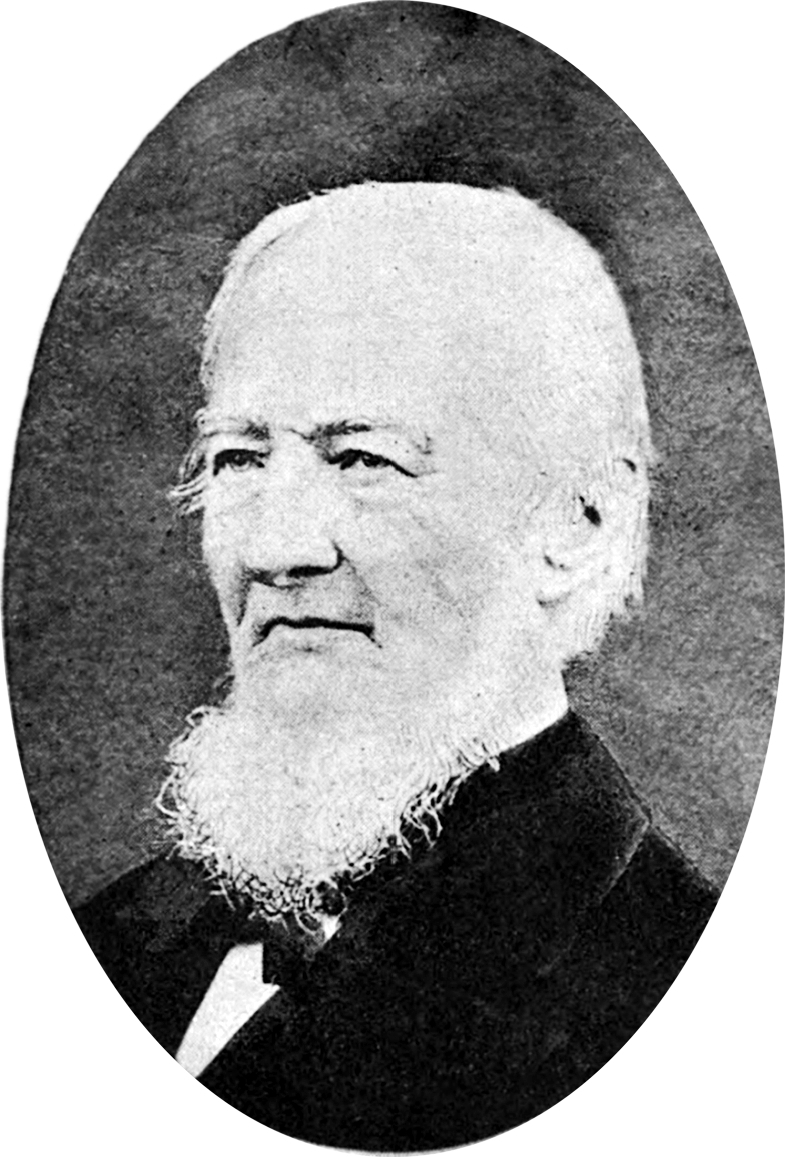
- Born: March 12, 1796; Freehold Borough, New Jersey, US
- Died: December 8, 1877 (aged 81); Kobe, Japan
- Occupation: Missionary
- Spouse: Fanny Hinckley Thomas
- Children: 8

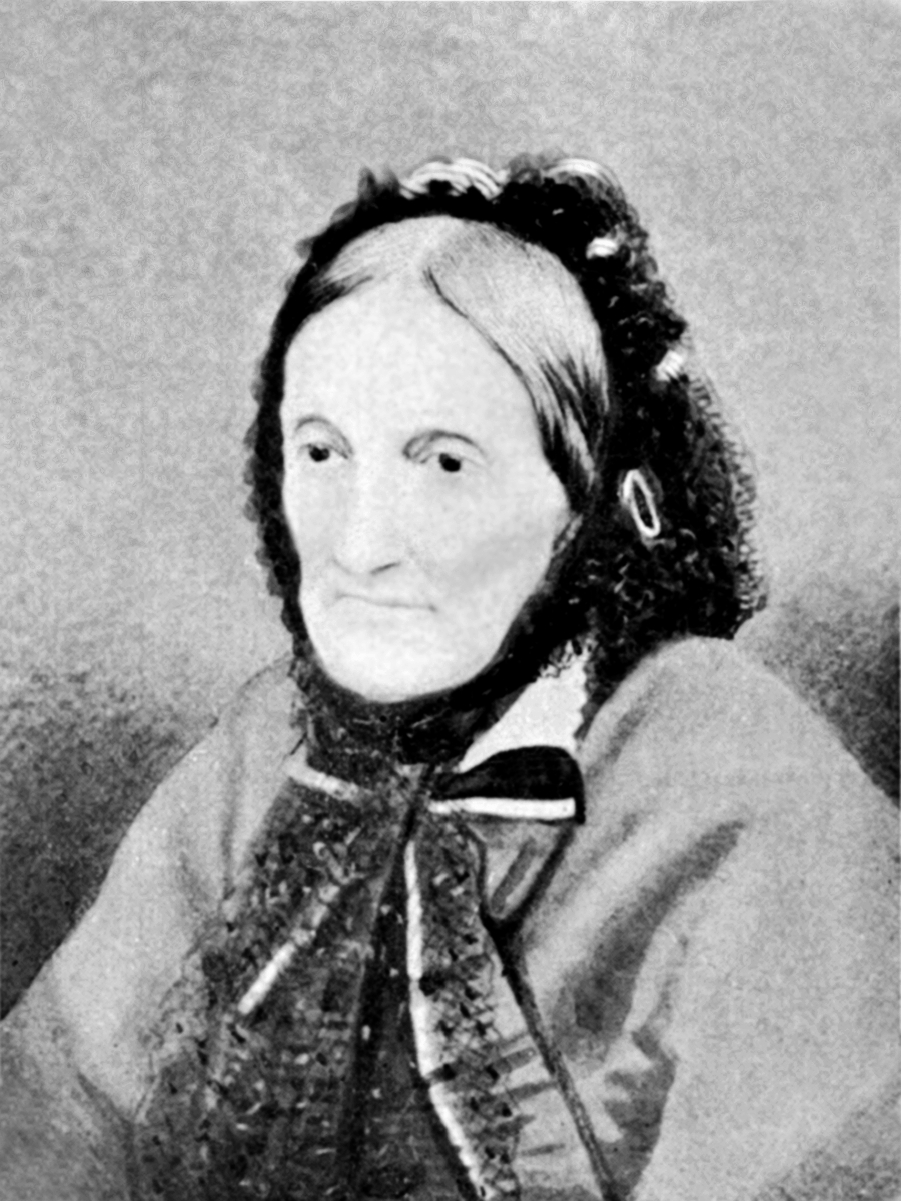
Fanny Gulick (1798–1883)

Peter Johnson Gulick (March 12, 1796 – December 8, 1877) was a missionary to the Kingdom of Hawaii and Japan. His descendants carried on the tradition of missionary work, and included several scientists.

== Life ==
Peter Johnson Gulick was born March 12, 1796, in Freehold Borough, New Jersey, to John Gulick (1766–1838) and Lydia Combs (1768–1836). He studied at the private Lawrenceville School from 1820 to 1822. Along with James Brainerd Taylor (1801–1829) and two other students, Gulick helped found Princeton University's Philadelphian Society of Nassau Hall (1825–1930, now called Princeton Christian Fellowship). He graduated from Princeton in 1825, and did additional studies at the Princeton Theological Seminary in 1827.

On September 5, 1827, he married Frances "Fanny" Hinckley Thomas who was born April 16, 1798, in Lebanon, Connecticut. He was ordained as a Presbyterian minister on October 3, 1827.

On November 3, 1827, the couple sailed from Boston as part of the third company of missionaries from the American Board of Commissioners for Foreign Missions. They reached Honolulu, Hawaii, on March 30, 1828. They were first assigned to the mission at Waimea on the island of Kauaʻi. In 1835 they moved to Kōloa on Kauaʻi, where the Kōloa sugar plantation had just been started by Ladd & Co.

After the Ladd company failed in 1843, they moved to the island of Molokaʻi where they assisted Harvey Rexford Hitchcock and his wife Rebecca Howard Hitchcock. In 1847 they moved to Waialua on the island of Oʻahu. In 1857 they moved to Honolulu.

His brother William Gulick married Fanny's sister Eliza Throop Thomas (1804–1903). Their son Charles T. Gulick (1841–1897) also went to Hawaii to serve as a missionary.

In 1874, the Gulicks went to Kobe, Japan to join their sons. Peter Gulick died on December 8, 1877. Fanny died May 24, 1883, in Kobe. They had a total of 8 children who traveled throughout the world.

== Descendants ==
- Son Luther Halsey Gulick was born in Honolulu on June 10, 1828, married Louisa Lewis October 29, 1850, and became a missionary physician. He died on April 8, 1891, in Springfield, Massachusetts.
  - Their son Sidney Lewis Gulick (1860–1945) was a minister in Japan and educator in the US. Sidney's son, also named Luther Halsey Gulick (1892–1993), was a social scientist.
  - Luther and Louisa's son Luther Halsey Gulick Jr. (1865–1918) was a physician who founded Camp Fire Girls. He supervised the development of the game of basketball. Luther Jr.'s daughter Frances Gulick (1891–1936) operated a canteen for servicemen near the front lines of World War I.

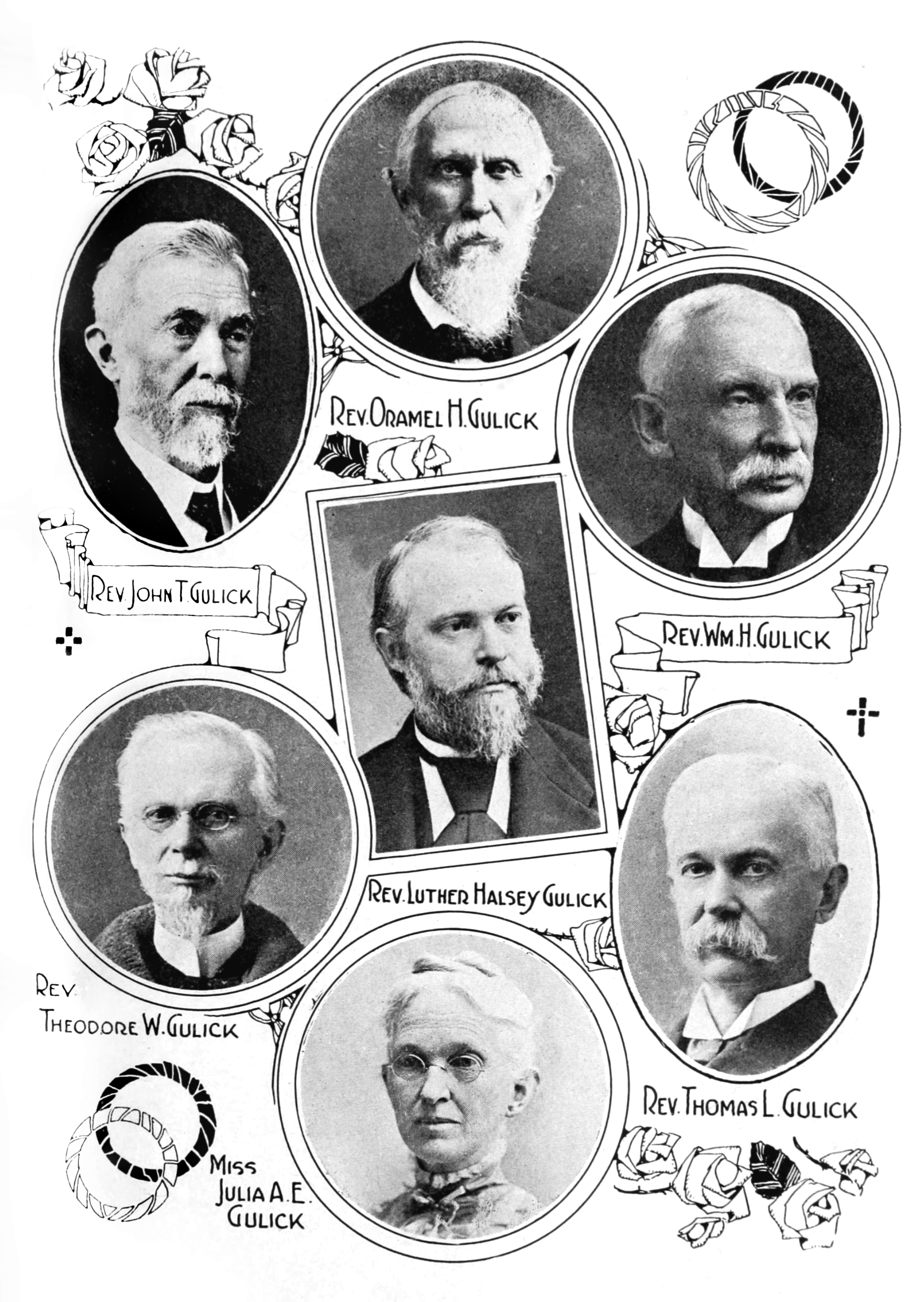
The seven surviving children all became missionaries

- Son Orramel Hinckley Gulick was born in Honolulu October 7, 1830, married Ann Eliza Clark (1833–1938), daughter of missionary Ephraim Weston Clark (1799–1878). He served as a missionary to Japan, and returned to Hawaii, where he died September 18, 1923. They published a history of the missions in 1918.
- Son John Thomas Gulick was born March 13, 1832, on Kauaʻi, became a missionary and biologist and died April 14, 1923. He exchanged ideas on some of the early theories of evolution with Charles Darwin.
- Son Charles Finney Gulick was born April 10, 1834, in Honolulu. He died January 18, 1854, in Glenhaven, New York, before he could attend college.
- Son William Hooker Gulick was born November 18, 1835, on Kauaʻi. He first traveled to Venezuela and Colombia. He married Alice Gordon Kitteredge December 12, 1871, and became a missionary to Spain that year. They founded Instituto Internacional in Madrid as a school for girls in 1892.

He moved to Boston in 1919 where he died April 14, 1922.

- Son Theodore Weld Gulick was born May 8, 1837 (named for Theodore Dwight Weld), married Mary Agnes Thompson in 1867. He trained as a dentist, but became a missionary to various places from Kyoto, Japan to Milwaukee, Wisconsin. He died April 7, 1924, in Long Beach, California.
  - Their son Walter Vose Gulick, (April 14, 1870 – February 10, 1922) became a physician and author in Washington state.
- Son Thomas Lafron Gulick was born April 10, 1839, married Alice E. Walbridge (1843–1911) in 1872, and joined his brother William in Spain in 1873. In 1883 they left Spain and worked in Cuba, Las Vegas, Nevada; and New Mexico. They returned to Hawaii in 1886, where he was pastor of Makawao Union Church 1887–1892. In 1893 they moved to Philadelphia, where she was matron and he chaplain at the Penn Presbyterian Medical Center. On an expedition with Samuel Thomas Alexander and Annie Montague Alexander to Africa, Thomas died on August 15, 1904, in Kijabe, Kenya.
- Daughter Julia Ann Eliza Gulick was born June 5, 1845, and moved with her parents to live with Orramel in Kobe in 1874. She worked as a missionary there, until returning to Honolulu and working with Japanese people in Hawaii; she died in 1936.

She, Orramel, John, and Sidney are buried in the Mission House cemetery at Kawaiahaʻo Church. Since Julia had not yet been born when her brother Luther Halsey Gulick left for the United States in 1840, the family never was all together in the same place at one time.

All the children except Luther graduated from Punahou School Luther Gulick served as a trustee from 1865-1870.

=== Family tree ===
Gulick family tree

Peter Johnson Gulick (1796–1877)	Fanny Hinckley Thomas (1798–1883)
Luther Halsey Gulick Sr. (1828–1891)	Orramel Hinckley Gulick (1830–1923)	John Thomas Gulick (1832–1923)	William Hooker Gulick (1835–1922)
Theodore Weld Gulick (1837–1924)
Thomas Lafron Gulick (1839–1904)
Sarah Frances Gulick (1854–1937)	Sidney Gulick (1860–1945)	Luther Gulick (1865–1918)
Luther Halsey Gulick (1892–1993)	Sidney Lewis Gulick Jr. (1902–1988)	Frances Jewett Gulick (1891–1936)
Denny Gulick
