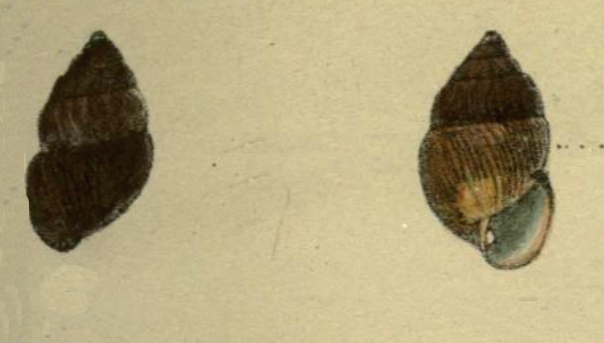
- Shell of Amastra inflata

Scientific classification
- Kingdom: Animalia
- Phylum: Mollusca
- Class: Gastropoda
- Order: Stylommatophora
- Family: Amastridae
- Genus: Amastra
- Species: A. inflata

Binomial name
- Amastra inflata (L. Pfeiffer, 1856)

Synonyms
- Achatinella (Laminella) inflata L. Pfeiffer, 1856 alternative representation; Amastra (Amastra) inflata (L. Pfeiffer, 1856) alternative representation

= Amastra inflata =

Species of mollusc

Amastra inflata is a species of air-breathing land snail, a terrestrial pulmonate gastropod mollusc in the family Amastridae.

== Description ==
The length of the shell attains 16.5 mm, its diameter 10 mm

The shell is imperforate, conic-globose, and rather coarsely striate. It is whitish in color, covered with a black epidermis that is worn off, forming a broad band below the suture. The spire is swollen, culminating in a short, acute cone. There are 5½ whorls, with the last three being very turgid. The body whorl is approximately as long as the spire.

The aperture is oblique and sinuate-oval, white on the interior. The columellar fold is subtransverse and ascends steeply. The peristome is unexpanded and labiate on the inner edge. The columellar margin is callous, dilated, and adnate.

The shell's shape varies widely. The embryonic whorls are nearly smooth, bearing only fine growth striae, similar to Amastra decorticata. On the later whorls, the wrinkles become coarser and more irregular, occasionally intersected by faint spiral lines in some individuals.

The shell color is a rich chestnut with orange hues, overlaid by a very thin, darker outer layer of almost chocolate-brown. This layer is often worn away on the wrinkles and is absent below the periphery in front of the aperture. Behind the lip, the color darkens to deep chocolate or blackish, and a darker peripheral band is sometimes visible. A denuded subsutural belt, mentioned by Pfeiffer, appears on some shells, both in dead and a few living specimens.

Beneath the colored cuticle, the shell's substance is fleshy-whitish in the body whorl but typically darker in the spire, giving it a purplish-brown appearance. Immature shells are very ventricose and exhibit a distinct, sharp peripheral angle that persists through the fifth whorl. The last two whorls are prominently swollen below the suture, occasionally developing a beaded appearance, which emerges as late as the last half of the final whorl.

Mature shells are generally imperforate, though younger specimens may remain perforate until reaching about 10 mm in length, with 4½ to 5 whorls.

== Distribution ==
This species is endemic to Hawaii, occurring on Oahu island.
