= Frances Gulick =

American welfare worker

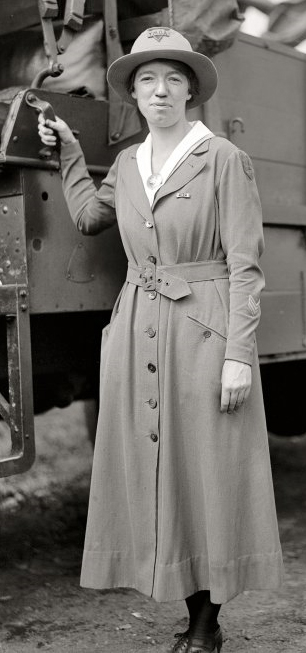
- Gulick in 1919
- Born: April 6, 1891; Springfield, Massachusetts, U.S.
- Died: November 29, 1936 (aged 45); New York City, U.S.
- Known for: War hero

Frances Jewett Gulick (April 6, 1891 – November 29, 1936) was an American Y.W.C.A. welfare worker who was awarded a United States Army citation for valor and courage on the field during the aerial bombardment of Varmaise, Oise, France in World War I. She was attached to the First Engineers in Europe, and was operating a canteen at the time. Gulick was pictured with three overseas service stripes on her sleeve, which represents at least 18 months of service.

== Biography ==
Frances Jewett Gulick was born April 6, 1891, in Springfield, Massachusetts. Her mother was Charlotte Emily "Lottie" (Vetter) Gulick. Her father, Luther Halsey Gulick Jr., M.D., designed the Y.M.C.A. logo. Her great-grandparents was Peter Johnson Gulick and Fanny Hinckley Thomas Gulick, early missionaries to the Kingdom of Hawaii.

Her army citation read as follows:

Miss Frances Gulick, Y.W.C.A. (attached to 1st U.S. Engineers) welfare worker, who has displayed the finest qualities of energy, courage and devotion in the discharge of her duties throughout the war and occupation of hostile territory, notably during the aerial bombardment at Vernaise, May 30, 1918, where, in spite of many casualties in the town, she remained at her post. From then until the division was relieved in July, 1918, Miss Gulick, with total disregard for her own personal safety, continued to operate her canteen, although the town was shelled and bombed at different times by the enemy, and her canteen itself struck.

Gulick died November 29, 1936, in New York City.

== Family tree ==
Gulick family tree

Peter Johnson Gulick (1796–1877)	Fanny Hinckley Thomas (1798–1883)
Luther Halsey Gulick Sr. (1828–1891)	Orramel Hinckley Gulick (1830–1923)	John Thomas Gulick (1832–1923)	William Hooker Gulick (1835–1922)
Theodore Weld Gulick (1837–1924)
Thomas Lafron Gulick (1839–1904)
Sarah Frances Gulick (1854–1937)	Sidney Gulick (1860–1945)	Luther Gulick (1865–1918)
Luther Halsey Gulick (1892–1993)	Sidney Lewis Gulick Jr. (1902–1988)	Frances Jewett Gulick (1891–1936)
Denny Gulick
