= Luther Gulick (social scientist) =

American academic (1892–1993)

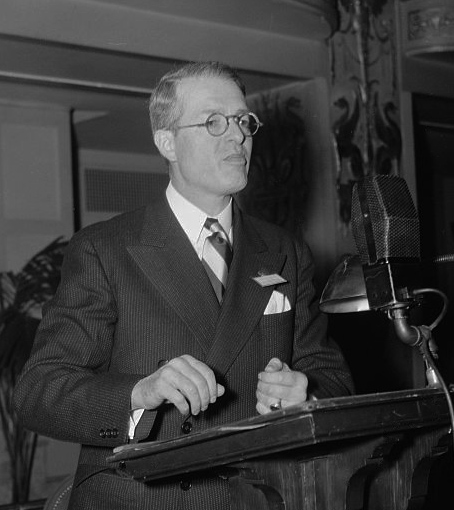
- In 1939 at Council of State Governments
- Born: Luther Halsey Gulick; January 17, 1892; Osaka, Japan
- Died: January 10, 1993 (aged 100); Walden, Vermont, US
- Education: Oberlin College and Columbia University

Luther Halsey Gulick (1892–1993) was an American political scientist, Eaton Professor of Municipal Science and Administration at Columbia University, and Director of its Institute of Public Administration, known as an expert on public administration.

== Early life ==
Luther Halsey Gulick was born January 17, 1892, in Osaka, Japan. His father was congregationalist missionary Sidney Lewis Gulick (1860–1945), and his mother was Clara May (Fisher) Gulick. Gulick graduated from Oberlin College in 1914 and received his Ph.D. from Columbia University in 1920.

== Career ==
Gulick taught at Columbia University in 1931 to 1934, being appointed Eaton Professor of Municipal Science and Administration. In 1921, he became president of its Institute of Public Administration and served until 1962.

In 1936, he was appointed by President Franklin D. Roosevelt to the three-member Committee on Administrative Management (better known as the Brownlow Committee, to reorganize the executive branch of the federal government. He served on this committee until 1938.

From 1954 to 1956, he served as city administrator of New York City.

== Death ==
He died on January 10, 1993, in Greensboro, Vermont. His first wife, Helen Swift, died in 1969. His second wife, Carol W. Moffett, died in 1989. He had two children, Luther Halsey Gulick Jr. and Clarence Gulick.

== Legacy ==
A park in New York City's Lower East Side neighborhood is named Luther Gulick Park honoring Gulick and his uncle Luther Halsey Gulick Jr.

=== Family tree ===
Luther Gulick shared his name with his grandfather, missionary Luther Halsey Gulick Sr. (1828–1891), and uncle medical doctor Luther Halsey Gulick Jr. (1865–1918). His great-grandfather was an earlier missionary to the Kingdom of Hawaii, Peter Johnson Gulick (1796–1877).

Gulick family tree

Peter Johnson Gulick (1796–1877)	Fanny Hinckley Thomas (1798–1883)
Luther Halsey Gulick Sr. (1828–1891)	Orramel Hinckley Gulick (1830–1923)	John Thomas Gulick (1832–1923)	William Hooker Gulick (1835–1922)
Theodore Weld Gulick (1837–1924)
Thomas Lafron Gulick (1839–1904)
Julia Ann Eliza Gulick (1845–1936)
Sarah Frances Gulick (1854–1937)	Sidney Gulick (1860–1945)	Luther Gulick (1865–1918)
Luther Halsey Gulick (1892–1993)	Sidney Lewis Gulick Jr. (1902–1988)	Frances Jewett Gulick (1891–1936)
Denny Gulick

== Work ==
=== POSDCORB ===
Among many other contributions in the public administration field, Gulick is perhaps best known for describing the functions of the chief executive represented in the acronym POSDCORB. The letters in the acronym stand for: Planning, Organizing, Staffing, Directing, Co-ordinating, Reporting and Budgeting. Gulick did not originate this model, but developed this model in his work. Since these are among Gulick's organizational patterns, they are interrelated. According to Gulick, POSDCORB reflected the way in which his organizations approached projects. Early on, these included The Institute of Public Administration and New York's Bureau of Municipal Research.

=== Keynesian policies ===
Gulick, alongside Alvin Hansen, helped persuade John Maynard Keynes to help develop post-war plans to promote full employment. This included a considerable emphasis on free trade.

Gulick advocate that it was impossible to separate politics and administration where there was a particular emphasis on their separation.

== Selected publications ==
- Gulick, Luther Halsey. Evolution of the Budget in Massachusetts. Vol. 2. Macmillan, 1920.
- Gulick, Luther, and Lyndall Urwick, eds. Papers on the Science of Administration. New York: Institute of Public Administration, 1937.
- Gulick, Luther Halsey. Administrative Reflections from World War II. University of Alabama Press, 1948.
- Gulick, Luther Halsey. American forest policy. Duell, Sloan & Pearce, 1951.
- Gulick, Luther Halsey. The Metropolitan Problems and American Ideas. Knopf, 1966.

Articles, a selection:

- Gulick, Luther. 1937. "Notes on the Theory of Organization." In Gulick, Luther; Urwick, Lyndall. Papers on the Science of Administration. New York: Institute of Public Administration. pp. 3–45.
- Gulick, Luther. 1937. "Science, values and public administration." In Gulick, Luther; Urwick, Lyndall. Papers on the Science of Administration. New York: Institute of Public Administration. pp. 189–195.
