= Partulina induta kaaeana =

Conservation status
- Data Deficient (IUCN 2.3)

- Critically Imperiled (NatureServe)

Scientific classification
- Kingdom: Animalia
- Phylum: Mollusca
- Class: Gastropoda
- Order: Stylommatophora
- Family: Achatinellidae
- Genus: Partulina
- Species: P. induta
- Subspecies: P. i. kaaeana

Trinomial name
- Partulina induta kaaeana Baldwin, 1906

Synonyms
- Partulina (Partulina) induta kaaeana D. D. Baldwin, 1906 alternative representation; Partulina (Partulina) kaaeana D. D. Baldwin, 1906 alternative representation; Partulina kaaeana D. D. Baldwin, 1906 superseded rank

Species of gastropod

Partulina induta kaaeana is a subspecies of tropical air-breathing land snail, a terrestrial pulmonate gastropod mollusk in the family Achatinellidae.

== Description ==
The shell measures 21 mm in length and 13 mm in diameter.

(Original description) The shell is sinistral, solid, and subperforated, possessing a globose form topped by a conical spire and a subacute apex. Its surface is rather lusterless and covered with coarse, wavy growth lines; however, under a lens, it reveals close and delicate decussating spiral lines, with the protoconch whorls being only faintly decussated. The coloration is an ashy brown, featuring a light brown band that sits just below the periphery and extends into the aperture. The entire surface is further embellished with minute longitudinal white flecks or streaks, while the apex is tessellated in white and brown.

There are six whorls, which are flatly convex and not margined above, separated by a lightly impressed suture. The aperture is a little oblique and oval in shape, possessing a livid-white interior that allows the outside coloring to show through. The peristome is acute, slightly thickened within, and expanded; its columellar margin is reflexed and displays a light brown tint on both the face and the reverse. The white columella terminates in a strong, projecting tooth that is prominently plaited.

When the animal is in motion, its extended body is longer than its shell. The mantle is brownish-black, with its outer edge bordered by a narrow white line. The foot is a light slate color both below and on the sides, while the upper portion of the head and the tentacles are a dark, granulated slate.

== Distribution ==
This species is endemic to Maui Island, Hawaii. It is found at an altitude of 4,000 feet on Mt. Helu in West Maui. It is one of the rarest animal species in the world, as it is believed to be extinct in the wild, and there are only 3 individuals in captivity.
