= Luther Gulick (physician) =

American physician

Luther Halsey Gulick, Jr.
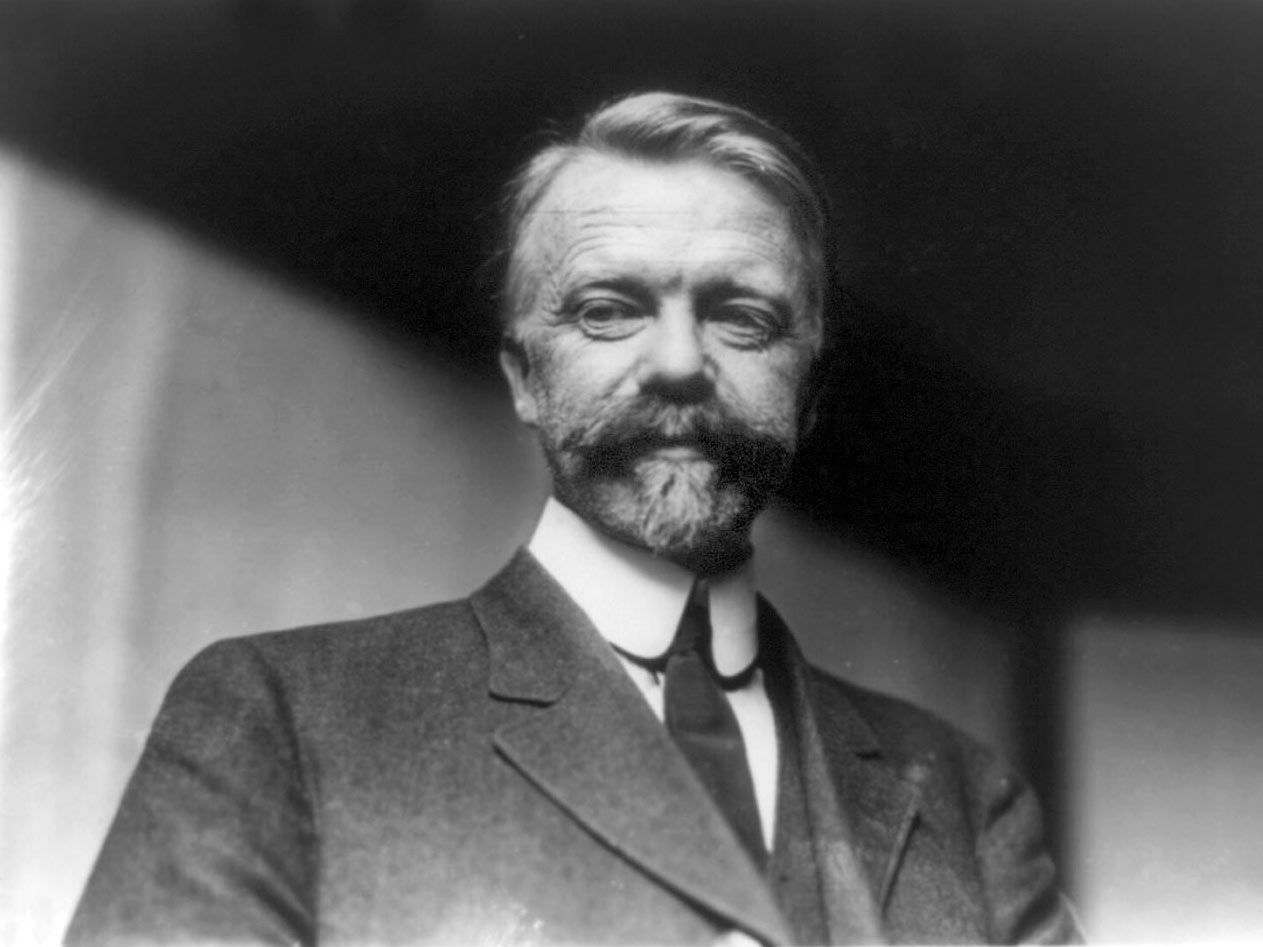
- Luther Gulick
- Born: Luther Halsey Gulick Jr. December 4, 1865; Honolulu, Hawaiian Islands
- Died: August 13, 1918 (aged 52); Casco, Maine, U.S.
- Known for: Physical education
- Spouse: Charlotte "Lottie" Emily Vetter
- Children: Frances Gulick

Luther Halsey Gulick Jr. (December 4, 1865 – August 13, 1918) was an American physical education instructor, international basketball official, and founder with his wife of the Camp Fire Girls, an international youth organization now known as Camp Fire.

== Life ==
Gulick was born December 4, 1865, in Honolulu of the Hawaiian Kingdom. His father was missionary physician Luther Halsey Gulick Sr. and his mother was Louisa Lewis. His paternal grandparents Peter Johnson Gulick and Fanny Gulick were earlier missionaries.

He married Charlotte "Lottie" Emily Vetter of Hanover, New Hampshire in 1887.

He studied at Oberlin Academy (a preparatory department of Oberlin College) 1880–1882 and 1883–1886 and at the Sargent Normal School for physical training (now the Boston University college of Health and Rehabilitation Sciences) He graduated from the medical school of New York University in 1889.

Gulick was founding superintendent of the physical education department of the International YMCA Training School, now Springfield College, in Springfield, Massachusetts, from 1887 to 1900.

He designed a triangle logo—Spirit, Mind, & Body—representing the YMCA philosophy. This evolved into the block letter "Y" used in the modern YMCA logo, as well as the Springfield College seal.

Gulick persuaded a young instructor named James Naismith, a teacher at the school, to create an indoor game that could be played during the off-season. In response, Naismith invented and popularized basketball. Gulick worked with Naismith to spread the sport, chairing the Basketball Committee of the Amateur Athletic Union (1895–1905) and representing the United States Olympic Committee during the 1908 Olympic Games. For his efforts to increase the popularity of basketball and of physical fitness in general, Gulick was inducted into the Basketball Hall of Fame as a contributor in 1959.

He was principal of the Pratt Institute High School from 1900 to 1903. From 1903 to 1908, he headed physical training in the public schools of New York City, and from 1908 to 1913 directed the department of child hygiene at the Russell Sage Foundation. He served as president of the American Physical Education Association in 1903-1906, of the Public School Physical Training Society in 1905-1908, and of the Camp Fire Girls after 1913.

He gave talks at the 1904 St. Louis World's Fair to promote his ideas for physical training in schools In 1907, Gulick was the president of the Playground Association of America, which later became the National Recreation Association and then the National Recreation and Park Association.

With his wife, Gulick founded the Camp Fire Girls to prepare women for work outside the home. In 1975, its name changed to Camp Fire USA as it accepted boys and girls and in 2012 it was renamed Camp Fire. The Gulicks helped create and expand the Boy Scout movement, as both the Camp Fire Girls and Boy Scouts movements helped to promote physical fitness and expand exercise opportunities for youth. Gulick recommending the secretary of the Playground Association, James E. West to head the new Boy Scouts of America.

Gulick also founded Camp Timanous, a boys' summer camp and Camp Wohelo, a girl's summer camp, located near Raymond, Maine.

His older brother Sidney Gulick was a missionary to Japan. Sidney's son (Luther Gulick Jr.'s nephew), also named Luther Halsey Gulick, was an expert on public administration.

His sister, Frances Gulick Jewett, wrote a series of books on public health and hygiene, which were regarded as the leading publications on public sanitation for many years, and biography of their father. His other siblings included Reverend Edward Leeds Gulick and Pierre Johnson Gulick. His sister's namesake, daughter Frances Jewett Gulick, was honored for her service in World War I.

Gulick died August 13, 1918, at his camp in Casco, Maine. He had just returned from France inspecting troops of the US forces in World War I.

Gulick, together with his wife Charlotte, are honored with a bronze medallion on the Extra Mile National Monument.

A park in New York City's Lower East Side neighborhood is named Luther Gulick Park honoring Gulick and his nephew Dr. Luther Halsey Gulick.

=== Family tree ===
Gulick family tree

Peter Johnson Gulick (1796–1877)	Fanny Hinckley Thomas (1798–1883)
Luther Halsey Gulick Sr. (1828–1891)	Orramel Hinckley Gulick (1830–1923)	John Thomas Gulick (1832–1923)	William Hooker Gulick (1835–1922)
Theodore Weld Gulick (1837–1924)
Thomas Lafron Gulick (1839–1904)
Julia Ann Eliza Gulick (1845–1936)
Sarah Frances Gulick (1854–1937)	Sidney Gulick (1860–1945)	Luther Gulick (1865–1918)
Luther Halsey Gulick (1892–1993)	Sidney Lewis Gulick Jr. (1902–1988)	Frances Jewett Gulick (1891–1936)
Denny Gulick

== Honors and awards ==
- Honorary Fellow in Memoriam, National Academy of Kinesiology

== Works ==
Besides editing Physical Education (1891-1896), Association Outlook (1897-1900), American Physical Education Review (1901-1903), and the Gulick Hygiene Series, he wrote:

- Manual of Physical Measurements (1892)
- Ten minutes' exercise for busy men: a complete course in physical education: five separate courses, free work, chest weights, dumb bells, wands, Indian clubs. American Sports Publishing Company. 1902.
- Physical Education by Muscular Exercise (1904)
- The Efficient Life (1907)
- Mind and Work (1908)
- The Healthful Art of Dancing (1910)
- Medical Inspection of Schools, with Leonard Porter Ayres (1908, 1913)
- Health by Muscular Gymnastics (1916)

== See also ==
- Elizabeth Burchinal, dance educator associated with physical education.
