= Luther Halsey Gulick Sr. =

American missionary (1828–1891)

Luther Halsey Gulick
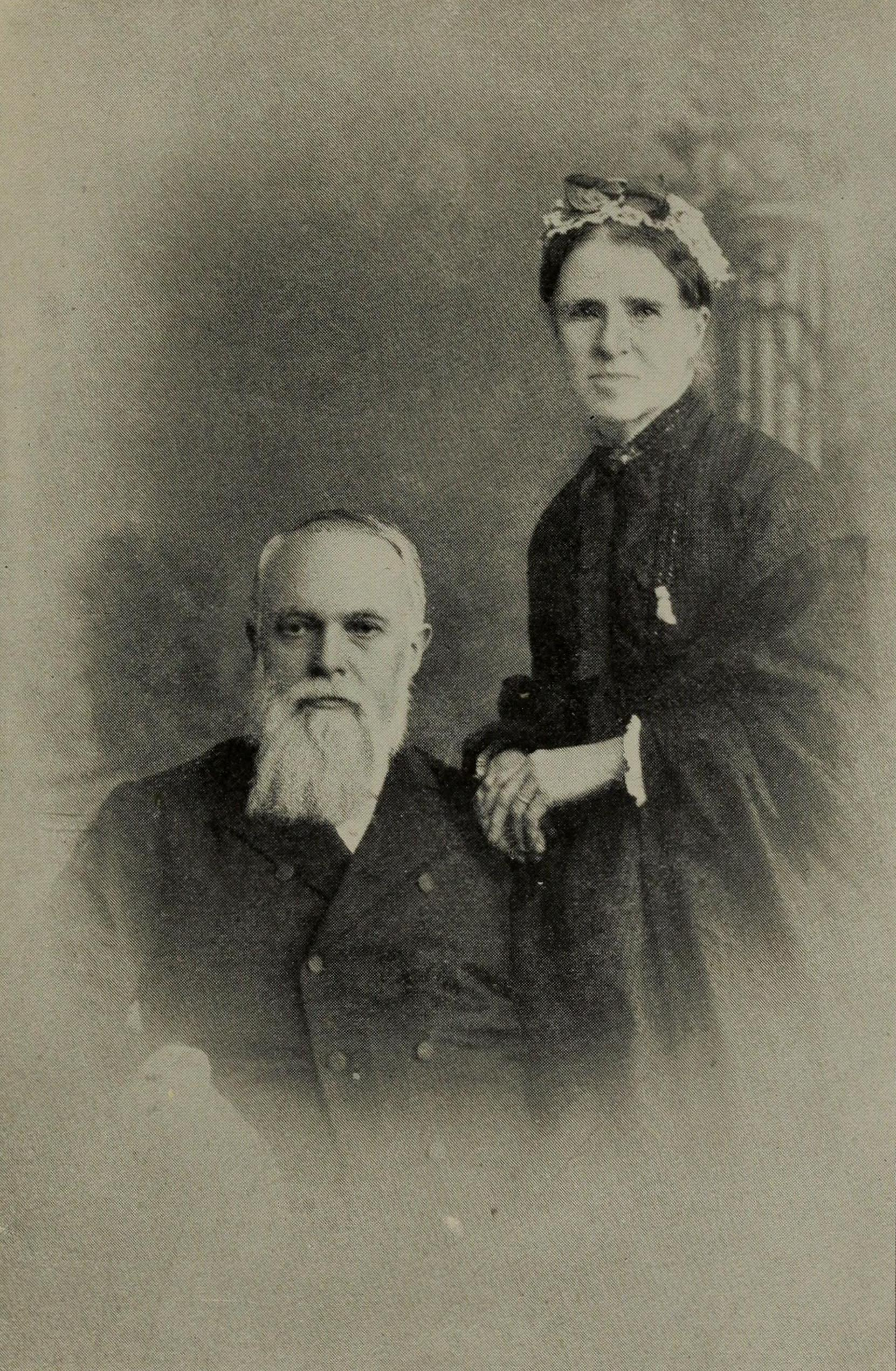
- Luther Halsey and Louisa Lewis Gulick
- Born: June 10, 1828; Honolulu, Hawaiian Kingdom
- Died: April 8, 1891 (aged 62); Springfield, Massachusetts, U.S.
- Occupation: Missionary
- Spouse: Louisa Lewis
- Children: Sidney Lewis Gulick; Luther Halsey Gulick Jr. Frances Gulick Jewett + others
- Parent: Peter Johnson Gulick <be> Fanny Hinckley Thomas

Luther Halsey Gulick Sr. (June 10, 1828 – April 8, 1891) was a missionary to the Hawaiian Kingdom and several other places. Although educated in medicine, in later life he became a newspaper editor while several of his children became active in public health.

== Life ==
Luther Halsey Gulick, generally known as "Halsey", was born in Honolulu on June 10, 1828. His father was Peter Johnson Gulick (1796–1877) and mother was Fanny Hinckley Thomas (1798–1883), of the American Board of Commissioners for Foreign Missions. He grew up on the island of Kauaʻi. On October 2, 1840 (only 12 years old) he traveled around Cape Horn to New England on a whaleship, arriving May 28, 1841. He lived with an aunt and uncle in New Jersey, and then stayed with Luther Halsey (1794–1880, for whom he was named), a classmate of his father's at Princeton University who was now a professor at the Auburn Theological Seminary. He attended school in New Jersey from 1846 through 1847, and graduated from New York University medical school in 1850.

Gulick married Louisa Lewis October 29, 1850, and was ordained in October 1851. They sailed back to Hawaii and then to Micronesia where they served as missionaries until 1859. They moved to Ebon Atoll in the Marshall Islands, and then traveled back to the United States for a lecture tour in 1862 and 1863. Returning again to Hawaii in 1864 he served as head of the Hawaiian Evangelical Association. He was convinced to do this by Rufus Anderson, head of foreign missions for ABCFM, who wanted to make the missions more self-sustaining.

Louisa founded a female school in her home called the Kawaiahaʻo Seminary for Girls, which later became part of the Mid-Pacific Institute. Gulick became a trustee of Punahou School during this time.

His family was considered more liberal than other missionaries, which caused friction in his new role. His younger brother John Thomas Gulick (1832–1923) for example worked with Charles Darwin developing the study of evolution. Another younger brother Orramel Gulick became active in politics, opposing the 1864 Constitution of the Kingdom of Hawaii which only allowed property holders to vote. The Gulick brothers advocated the retirement of older white missionaries to be replaced by native Hawaiians. They also protested the labor system of sugarcane plantations in Hawaii that seemed to resemble the slavery that resulted in the American Civil War. However, the war had proven good business for some former missionaries such as Samuel Northrup Castle who profited from the increased demand for sugar.

Gulick became editor of the Hawaiian language newspaper Ka Hoku Loa and then Ka Nupepa Kūʻokoʻa ("the independent newspaper") for publisher Henry Martyn Whitney. His editorials attacked the government of King Kamehameha V which he considered a step backwards to absolute monarchy. He convinced Hawaiian historians such as Samuel Kamakau and John Papa ʻĪʻī to write articles on the culture that was disappearing under a government program to make the English language exclusive in the schools. He attacked Anglican Bishop Thomas Nettleship Staley and Board of Education member Charles de Varigny (a French Catholic) for aligning the Hawaiian government with old Europe and what he considered unreformed churches. The government issued a warrant for his arrest because of his editorials calling the legislature "parasites". He was released with a reprimand because no law could be found that he had broken.

The new head of ABCFM missions criticized the Gulicks for meddling in politics. To avoid further conflict Orramel resigned in June 1869 and moved to Osaka, Japan. In February 1870 Luther also left Hawaii, and returned to New England. In 1871 he became a missionary to Roman Catholics in Italy, and joined his brothers William and Thomas in Spain. In 1874 he toured missions in Turkey and then traveled to Japan and China. In Shanghai he edited a newspaper called The Chinese Recorder and Missionary Journal.

== Family ==
The Gulicks had eight biological children and adopted one child. Daughter Sarah Frances Gulick (1854–1937) married Professor Frank Fanning Jewett (1844–1926) of Oberlin College on July 30, 1880. She published numerous books on health and hygiene under the name Frances Gulick Jewett. Their house became part of the Oberlin Heritage Center.

Their son Sidney Lewis Gulick (1860–1945) was a minister in Japan and educator in the US. Sidney's son also named Luther Halsey Gulick (1892–1993) was a social scientist.

Their son Luther Halsey Gulick Jr. (1865–1918) was a medical doctor who founded Camp Fire Girls and supervised the invention of basketball. He was inducted into the Basketball Hall of Fame when it opened in 1959. Luther Jr.'s daughter Frances Gulick (1891–1936) operated a canteen for servicemen near the front lines of World War I.

Luther Halsey Gulick Sr. died on April 8, 1891, at his son Luther Halsey Gulick Jr.'s camp in Springfield, Massachusetts.

=== Family tree ===
Gulick family tree

Peter Johnson Gulick (1796–1877)	Fanny Hinckley Thomas (1798–1883)
Luther Halsey Gulick Sr. (1828–1891)	Orramel Hinckley Gulick (1830–1923)	John Thomas Gulick (1832–1923)	William Hooker Gulick (1835–1922)
Theodore Weld Gulick (1837–1924)
Thomas Lafron Gulick (1839–1904)
Julia Ann Eliza Gulick (1845–1936)
Sarah Frances Gulick (1854–1937)	Sidney Gulick (1860–1945)	Luther Gulick (1865–1918)
Luther Halsey Gulick (1892–1993)	Sidney Lewis Gulick Jr. (1902–1988)	Frances Jewett Gulick (1891–1936)
Denny Gulick
