= Merle Gulick =

American football player (1906–1976)

Merle Amerson Gulick
Profile
- Position: Quarterback

Personal information
- Born: June 19, 1906; Jackson, Michigan, U.S.
- Died: August 30, 1976 (aged 70); Ajijic, Mexico

Career information
- College: Hobart and William Smith Colleges; University of Toledo
- College Football Hall of Fame

Merle Gulick (June 19, 1906 – August 30, 1976) was an American football player. He was elected to the College Football Hall of Fame in 1965.

Gulick attended Maumee High School and Toledo University before moving on to attend Hobart College where he was graduated in 1930 as a member of Kappa Alpha Society. Following graduation he began work for the Equitable Life Assurance Society in New York and eventually became its Vice President for Public Relations and Personnel.

Merle Gulick had a second career over the same years as a leader in the charitable community. He was vice chairman of the Greater New York Fund, Chairman of the United Negro College Fund, the National Fund for Medical Education and the Greater New York Men's Committee. He was long time Chairman of the Board of Hobart and William Smith Colleges and National President of The Kappa Alpha Society.
