= Sidney Gulick =

American missionary (1860–1945)

Sidney Lewis Gulick
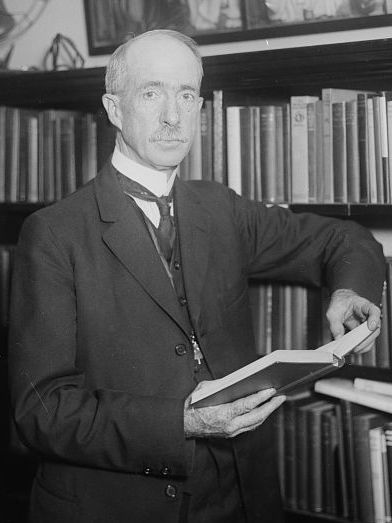
- Gulick in 1919
- Born: April 10, 1860; Ebon Atoll, Marshall Islands
- Died: December 20, 1945 (aged 85); Boise, Idaho, U.S
- Known for: Japanese-American relations
- Spouse: Cara May Fisher
- Children: Luther Halsey Gulick + 4 others

Sidney Lewis Gulick (April 10, 1860 – December 20, 1945) was an educator, author, and missionary who spent much of his life working to improve Japan–United States relations.

Gulick promoted Japan's colonialism in Korea and China, and downplayed claims that Japan was aggressively invading China.

== Biography ==
Gulick was born April 10, 1860, in Ebon Atoll, Marshall Islands. His father was missionary Luther Halsey Gulick Sr. (1828–1891), and mother was Louisa Mitchell (Lewis) Gulick (1830–1893). He was the brother of Luther Halsey Gulick, Jr. and grandson of the missionary couple Peter Johnson Gulick and Fanny Hinckley Thomas Gulick. He graduated from Oakland High School in 1879. He received an A.B. degree from Dartmouth College with his brother Edward Leeds Gulick in 1883, an A.M. degree in 1886 and a D.D. degree in 1903. He also held D.D. degrees from Yale and Oberlin College.

He was ordained a Congregational minister in 1886, and then was a supply minister at the Willoughby Avenue Mission, Brooklyn. He married Cara May Fisher (1860?–1941) on November 7, 1887.

In 1888, Gulick traveled to Japan, where he worked for the American Board of Commissioners for Foreign Missions through the following twenty-five years. He became fluent in Japanese, and gave sermons and wrote books in it. He taught English, science, and religion at several schools and universities in Japan. In his last seven years there, he served as Professor of Theology at Doshisha University in Kyoto and as lecturer at the Kyoto Imperial University.

After returning to the United States in 1913, Gulick was dismayed to find growing discrimination and resentment against Japanese Americans. He campaigned against California's anti-Asian legislation and urged equality of treatment for all nations. He promoted world peace, and was a vigorous proponent of the entry of the United States into the World Court.

Gulick actively defended Japan's colonialism in Korea. After Japan violently suppressed the 1919 March 1st Movement Korean peaceful protests, it began a campaign to cover up and spread disinformation about its violent response. Gulick expressed some dismay at the disinformation campaign, but nonetheless participated in it. He placed partial blame on the Koreans themselves for the violent suppression of the protests, and promoted the message that Japan was on a noble civilizing mission in Korea. On the other hand, he advocated for the deescalation of violence and reform efforts to demilitarize Japan's policies.

After passage of the Immigration Act of 1924, which virtually halted immigration to the U.S. from countries seen as "undesirable", Gulick served a key role in founding the Committee on World Friendship Among Children. In 1927, its first project was to organize the sending of American dolls to Japan for Hinamatsuri, an annual doll festival. This project had a significant response from the American public, and altogether, 12,739 of these "American Blue-eyed Dolls" were sent to Japanese schools, each with an accompanying letter professing friendship. The Japanese later sent 58 dolls back to the United States – one for each state, plus more for states with larger populations. These Japanese friendship dolls were around three feet high, and were dressed in traditional Japanese clothing. They came with a trunk full of their belongings including equipment for the tea ceremony. After these dolls toured the United States, they went back to their state. During World War II, many of the dolls, especially the ones in Japan, were seen as the enemy and were burned or stabbed. Many people saved dolls by hiding them until the war was over.

Gulick wrote many books about Japanese-American relations.

He died in Boise, Idaho, on December 20, 1945. According to his grandson, Sidney Gulick III, "his ashes were entombed in three places: alongside his father's in Springfield, Massachusetts; in Boise, Idaho; and in Kobe." He had three sons, Luther Halsey Gulick (1892–1993) who developed theories of government policy, Leeds Gulick (1894–1975), and Sidney Lewis Gulick Jr. (1902–1988), and two daughters, Mrs. Leverett Davis and Mrs. John Barrow. His grandson mathematics professor Denny Gulick (Sidney Lewis Gulick III) has tried to revive the doll exchange project.

== Family tree ==
Gulick family tree

Peter Johnson Gulick (1796–1877) | Fanny Hinckley Thomas (1798–1883)
Luther Halsey Gulick Sr. (1828–1891) | Orramel Hinckley Gulick (1830–1923) | John Thomas Gulick (1832–1923) | William Hooker Gulick (1835–1922)
Theodore Weld Gulick (1837–1924)
Thomas Lafron Gulick (1839–1904)
Julia Ann Eliza Gulick (1845–1936)
Sarah Frances Gulick (1854–1937) | Sidney Gulick (1860–1945) | Luther Gulick (1865–1918)
Luther Halsey Gulick (1892–1993) | Sidney Lewis Gulick Jr. (1902–1988) | Frances Jewett Gulick (1891–1936)
Denny Gulick

== Selected works ==
- Evolution of the Japanese: a study of their characteristics in relation to the principles of social and psychic development. F. H. Revell. 1905.
- The white peril in the Far East: an interpretation of the significance of the Russo-Japanese war. F. H. Revell Company. 1905. p. 3.
- The American Japanese problem: a study of the racial relations of the East and the West. C. Scribner's sons. 1914.
- The fight for peace: an aggressive campaign for American churches. F. H. Revell. 1915. p. 3.
- Working women of Japan. Missionary Education Movement of the United States and Canada. 1915.
- America and the Orient; outlines of a constructive policy (1916)
- Comprehensive immigration policy and program (1916)
- Anti-Japanese war-scare stories. Fleming H. Revell company. 1917.
- Japanese in California (1921)
- Should Congress enact special laws affecting Japanese?: A critical examination of the Hearings before the Committee on Immigration and Naturalization, held in California, July 1920. National Committee on American Japanese Relations. 1922. p. 1.
- Federal Council of the Churches of Christ in America. Commission on International Justice and Goodwill The Macmillan company, ed. (1922). The Christian crusade for a warless world.
- International goodwill (1924)
- New factors in American Japanese relations and a constructive proposal (1924)
- Toward understanding Japan; constructive proposals for removing the menace of war (1935)
- The Winning of the Far East: a study of the Christian movement in China, Korea, and Japan. George H. Doran Company. 1923.

=== Japanese titles ===
- Shinshinkaron (1911)
- Jinrui shinkaron / Shidoni Gyurikku cho. (1913)
- Nihon e yoseru sho / Gyurikku Hakase (1939)

=== Biography ===
- Advocate of understanding : Sidney Gulick and the search for peace with Japan by Sandra C. Taylor, Kent State University Press, 1984.
