= Jülich =

Place in North Rhine-Westphalia, Germany

- Town
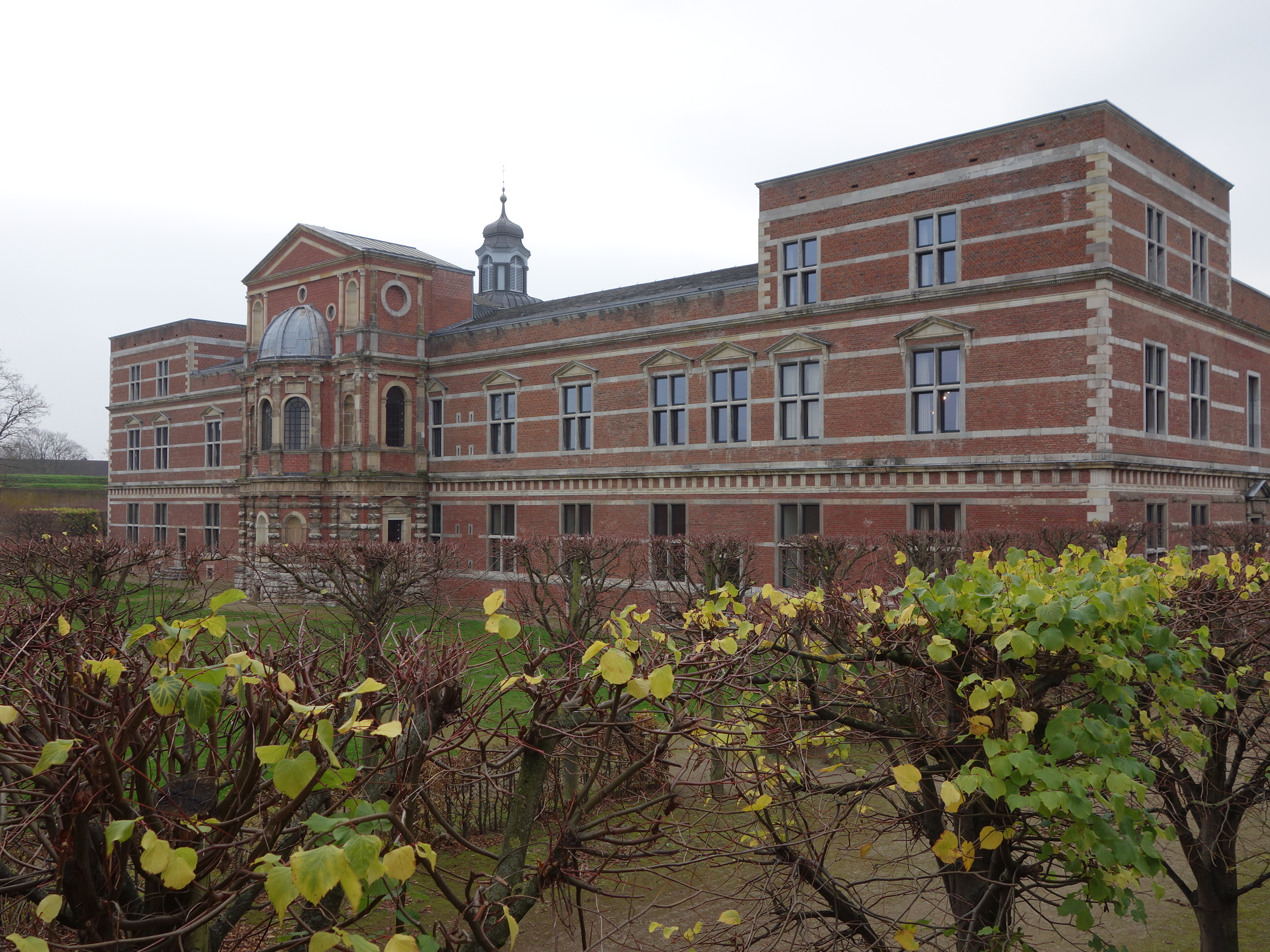
- Renaissance palace within the Jülich Citadel

- Flag Coat of arms

- Location of Jülich within Düren district
- Interactive map of Jülich
- Location within Germany Location within North Rhine-Westphalia
- Coordinates: 50°55′20″N 06°21′30″E
- Country: Germany
- State: North Rhine-Westphalia
- Admin. region: Cologne
- District: Düren
- Subdivisions: 16

Government
  - Mayor (2020–25): Axel Fuchs (Ind.)

Area
  - Total: 90.39 km^{2} (34.90 sq mi)
- Elevation: 83 m (272 ft)

Population (2025-12-31)
  - Total: 35,146
  - Density: 388.8/km^{2} (1,007/sq mi)
- Time zone: UTC+01:00 (CET)
  - Summer (DST): UTC+02:00 (CEST)
- Postal codes: 52428
- Dialling codes: 02461
- Vehicle registration: DN/JüL
- Website: www.juelich.de

Jülich (German pronunciation: [ˈjyːlɪç]; in old spellings also known as Guelich or Gülich, Dutch: Gulik, French: Juliers, Ripuarian: Jöllesch) is a town in the district of Düren, in the federal state of North Rhine-Westphalia, in western Germany. As a border region between the competing powers in the Lower Rhine and Meuse areas, the town and the Duchy of Jülich played a historic role from the Middle Ages up to the 17th century.

The town is well known in the state for being home to Forschungszentrum Jülich, one of the largest national research institutions in Europe.

== Geography ==
Jülich stands in the Rur valley on the banks of the river Rur. The town is bordered by the town of Linnich in the north, the municipality of Titz in the northeast, the municipality of Niederzier in the southeast, the municipality of Inden in the south, and by the municipality of Aldenhoven in the west. Its maximum size is 13.3 km from east to west and 10.9 km from north to south.

The highest point in Jülich is in Bourheim, 110 m above sea level (excepting Sophienhöhe, an extensive artificial mountain made up of overburden from a nearby open-pit lignite mine, the Tagebau Hambach). The lowest point, 70 m above sea level, lies in the borough of Barmen.

== History ==
Historical affiliations

Roman Empire 1st century–5th century
Franks 5th century
Francia 481–843
Middle Francia 843–855
Lotharingia 855–959
Duchy of Lower Lorraine 959–ca. 1003
County of Jülich ca. 1003–1356
Duchy of Jülich 1356–1423
Duchy of Jülich-Berg 1423–1794, part of:
United Duchies of Jülich-Cleves-Berg 1521–1614
Palatinate-Neuburg 1614–1685
Electoral Palatinate 1685–1794, part of:
Electorate of Bavaria 1777–1794
French Republic 1794–1804
French Empire 1804–1814
Kingdom of Prussia 1815–1871
German Empire 1871–1918
Weimar Republic 1918–1933
Nazi Germany 1933–1945
Allied-occupied Germany 1945–1949
West Germany 1949–1990
Germany 1990–present

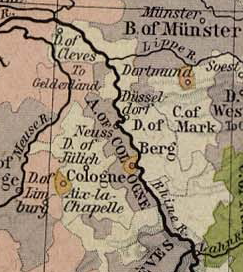
The Duchies of Cleves, Berg, Jülich and the County of Mark in 1477

Jülich is first mentioned in Roman times as Juliacum along an important road through the Rur valley. Fortified during the late Roman period, it was taken over by the Franks and grew to be the centre of a county which became the nucleus of a regional power. The counts and dukes of Jülich extended their influence during the Middle Ages and granted Jülich city status in 1234 (Count Wilhelm IV). During battles with the Archbishop of Cologne, Jülich was destroyed in 1239 and again in 1278.

In 1416, the city was granted fiscal independence by Duke Rainald of Jülich-Geldern.

Following a fire in 1547, the city was rebuilt as an ideal city in the Renaissance style under the direction of the architect Alessandro Pasqualini.

The citadel of Jülich was later visited by the French military engineer Sébastien le Prestre de Vauban and was rated exemplary.

After the ducal family line was extinguished in 1609, the Duchy of Jülich was divided in the War of the Jülich Succession; as part of that war, the fortress at Jülich was occupied by Emperor Rudolph's forces. The 1610 siege by Dutch, Brandenburg and Palatine forces led to the surrender and withdrawal of Imperial troops.

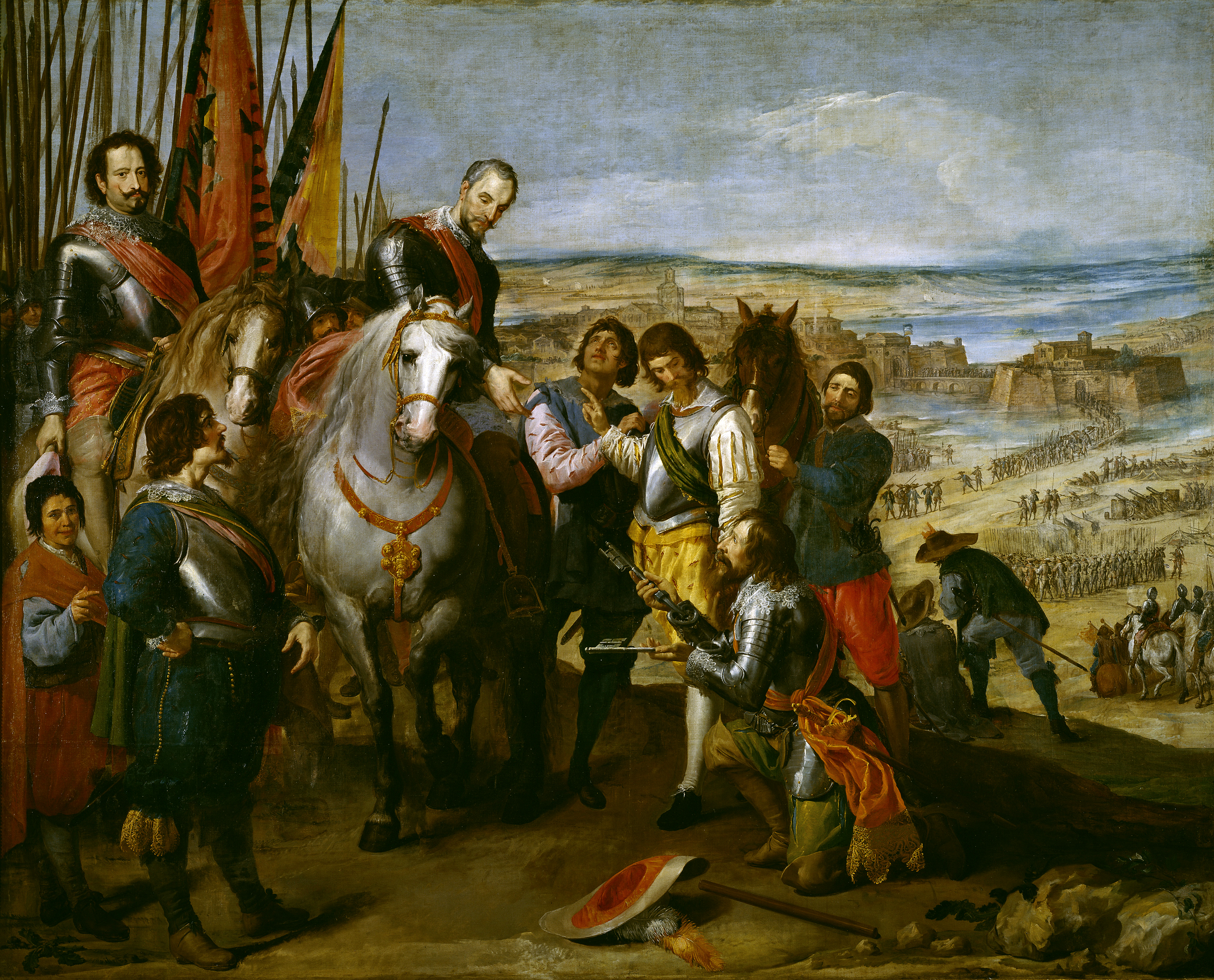
The Surrender of Jülich at the end of the 1621–22 siege, by Jusepe Leonardo (1635)

Jülich was occupied by the Dutch Republic until 1621-22 when the Spanish took the fortress after a five months of siege. Control of the city later fell to Palatinate-Neuburg, then the Electorate of the Palatinate (1685) and Bavaria (1777).

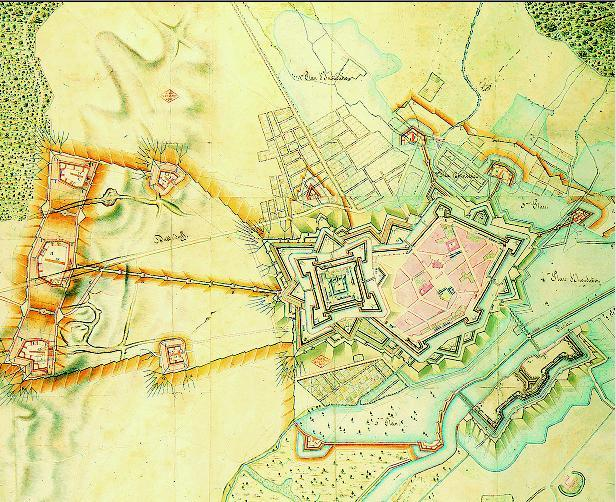
Maximum extent of the French fortification of Juliers

From 1794 to 1814, Jülich was part of France under the name of Juliers. The French added the Napoleonic bridge head to the fortifications. In 1815, Jülich became a Prussian fortification and district town. The town was subsequently administered within the Prussian Province of Jülich-Cleves-Berg (1815) and then the Rhine Province (1822). The fortification was razed in 1860.

During World War II, forced laborers of the 3rd SS construction brigade were dispatched in the town in 1943. On 16 November 1944, 97% of Jülich was destroyed during Allied bombing, since it was considered one of the main obstacles to the occupation of the Rhineland, although the city fortifications, the bridge head and the citadel had long fallen into disuse. The ruined city was subject to heavy fighting for several months until the Allies eventually managed to cross the Ruhr on 23 February 1945. Newsreel footage exists of Supreme Commander Eisenhower at the southern entrance to the citadel.

Jülich became part of the new state of North Rhine-Westphalia after the war. From 1949 to 1956, the town centre was rebuilt along the plans of the Renaissance town.

In 1998, the state garden fair took place in Jülich. This made the extensive restoration of the bridge head fortifications and the establishment of a large leisure park, the bridge head park, possible.

In June 2025, Jupiter, an exascale supercomputer hosted at Forschungszentrum Jülich in North Rhine-Westphalia, Germany, became operational .It was developed by the Jülich Supercomputing Centre (JSC) and owned by the European High-Performance Computing Joint Undertaking (EuroHPC JU). It is based on a modular architecture featuring NVIDIA GH200 Grace Hopper Superchips and is recognized as Europe's fastest supercomputer, ranking 4th on the November 2025 TOP500 list of the world's fastest supercomputers. Jupiter is also the most energy-efficient system among the top five.

Today, Jülich is mainly known for Forschungszentrum Jülich (established in 1956) and the satellite campus of the Fachhochschule Aachen (established in 1970). The town's landmark is the Witch Tower, a city gate and remnant of the medieval city fortifications. The most impressive remnants from the past are, however, both the Napoleonic Bridgehead and the Citadel.

== Climate ==
Köppen-Geiger climate classification system classifies its climate as oceanic (Cfb).

Climate data for Jülich
Month	Jan	Feb	Mar	Apr	May	Jun	Jul	Aug	Sep	Oct	Nov	Dec	Year
Mean daily maximum °C (°F)	4.5 (40.1)	5.7 (42.3)	9.5 (49.1)	13.7 (56.7)	18.3 (64.9)	21.4 (70.5)	22.8 (73.0)	22.7 (72.9)	19.7 (67.5)	14.7 (58.5)	8.8 (47.8)	5.7 (42.3)	14.0 (57.1)
Daily mean °C (°F)	2.1 (35.8)	2.8 (37.0)	5.8 (42.4)	9.1 (48.4)	13.3 (55.9)	16.4 (61.5)	17.9 (64.2)	17.9 (64.2)	15.1 (59.2)	10.9 (51.6)	6.1 (43.0)	3.3 (37.9)	10.1 (50.1)
Mean daily minimum °C (°F)	−0.3 (31.5)	0 (32)	2.2 (36.0)	4.6 (40.3)	8.3 (46.9)	11.4 (52.5)	13.1 (55.6)	13.1 (55.6)	10.6 (51.1)	7.1 (44.8)	3.5 (38.3)	0.9 (33.6)	6.2 (43.2)
Average precipitation mm (inches)	63 (2.5)	52 (2.0)	61 (2.4)	56 (2.2)	70 (2.8)	80 (3.1)	79 (3.1)	76 (3.0)	63 (2.5)	62 (2.4)	68 (2.7)	70 (2.8)	800 (31.5)
Source: Climate-Data.org (altitude: 85m)

== Boroughs ==
The town of Jülich comprises 16 boroughs:

- Town centre
- Altenburg
- Barmen
- Bourheim
- Broich
- Daubenrath
- Güsten
- Kirchberg
- Koslar
- Lich-Steinstraß
- Mersch
- Merzenhausen
- Pattern
- Selgersdorf
- Stetternich
- Welldorf (including Serrest)

== Gallery ==
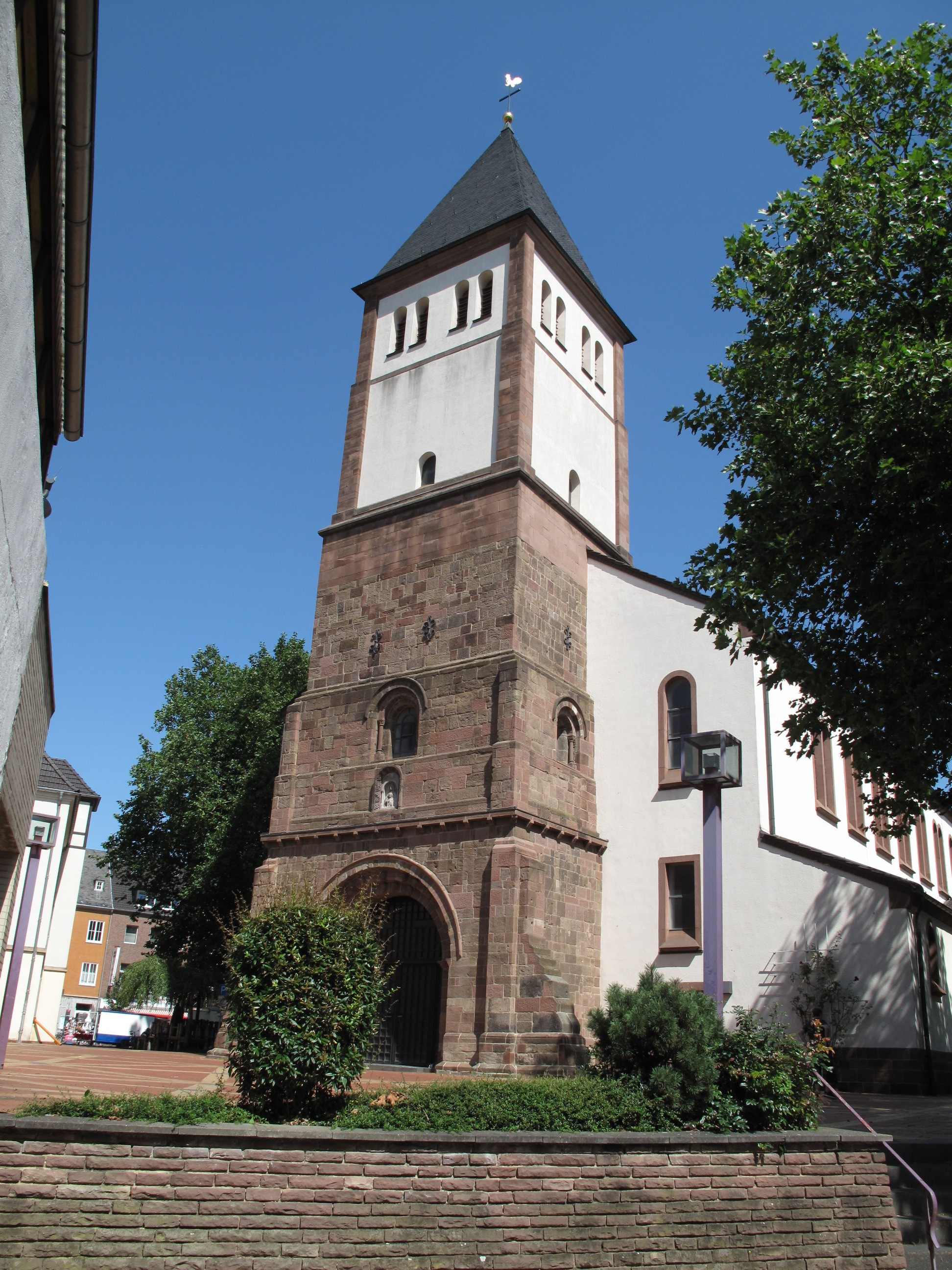
Jülich, church

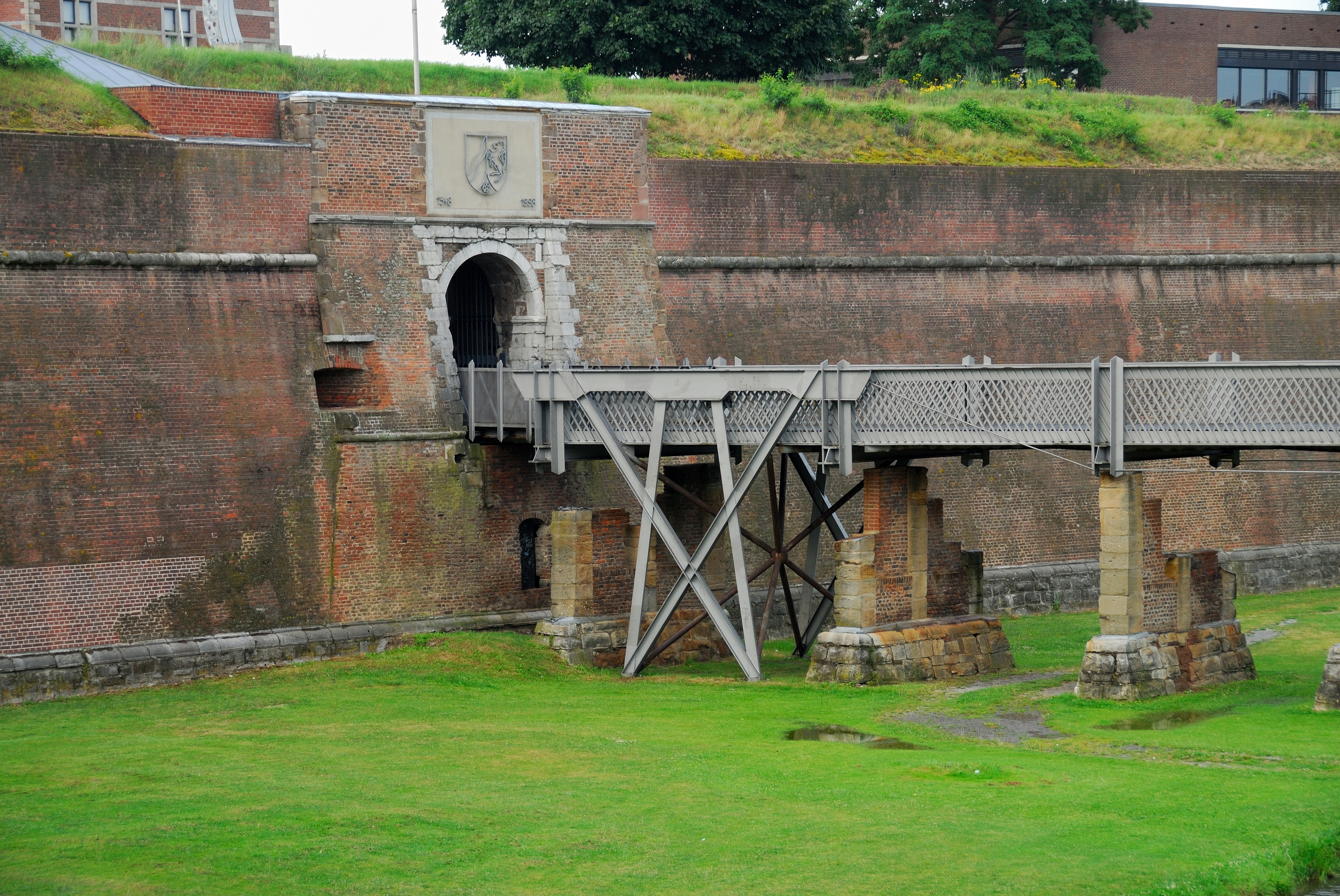
Entrance of the Citadel

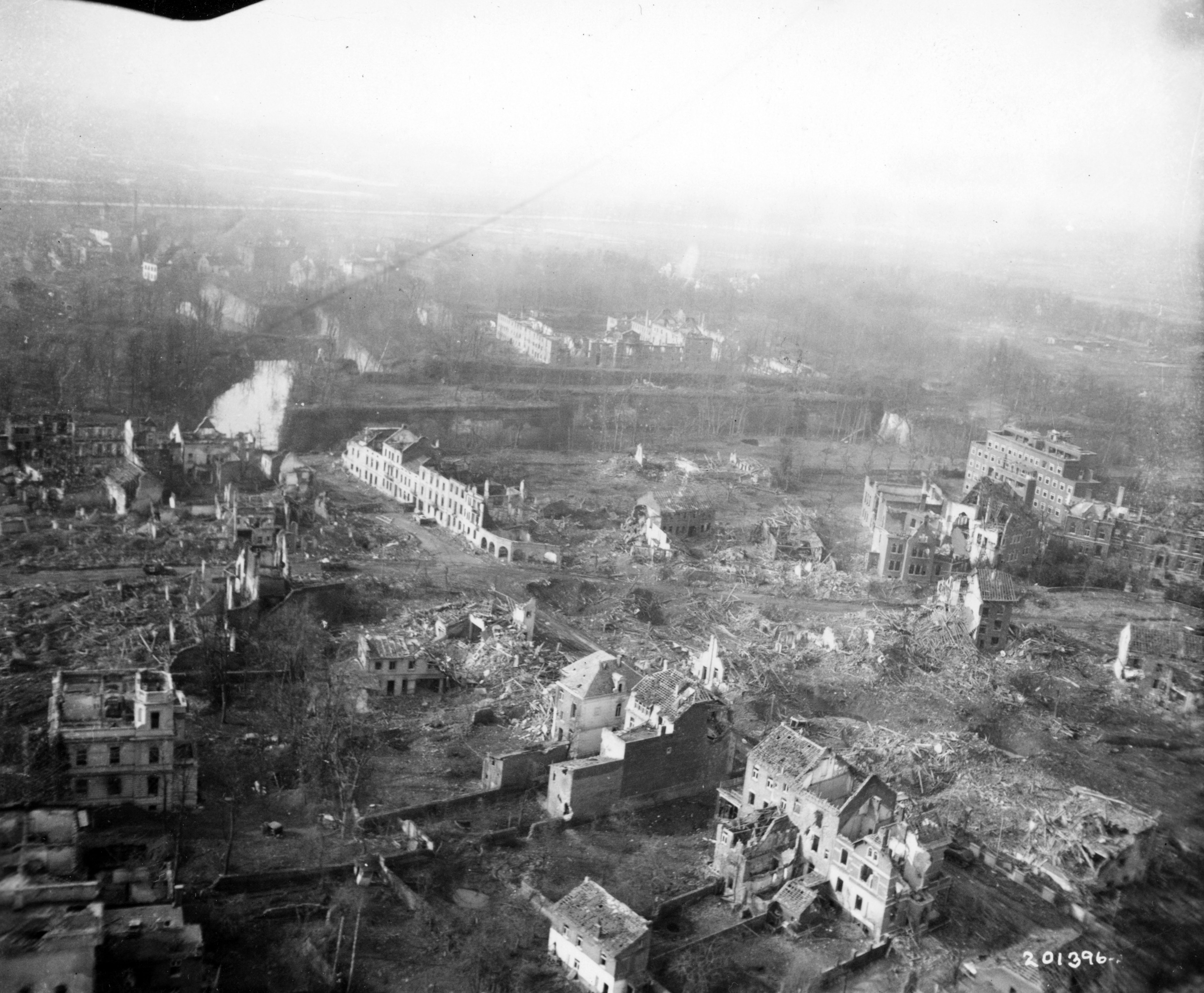
Citadel after World War II

== Population history ==
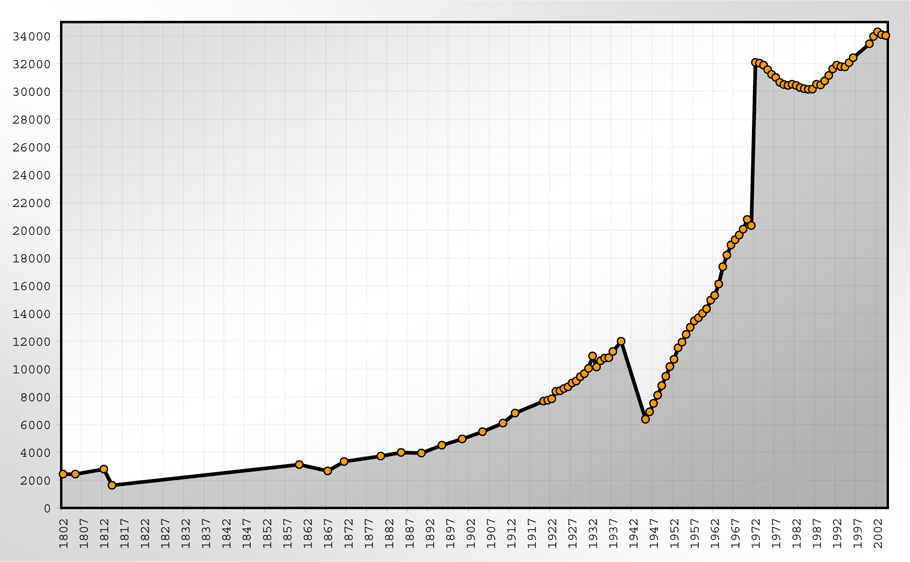
Population growth of Jülich since 1800

Historical population

Year	Pop.	±% p.a.
300	1,500	—
1533	1,300	−0.01%
1647	1,300	+0.00%
1735	1,520	+0.18%
1795	2,025	+0.48%
1802	2,429	+2.63%
1860	3,119	+0.43%
1900	4,964	+1.17%
1920	7,688	+2.21%
1931	10,051	+2.47%
1939	12,000	+2.24%
1951	10,182	−1.36%
1960	14,339	+3.88%

Year	Pop.	±% p.a.
1965	28,727	+14.91%
1970	31,108	+1.61%
1975	31,566	+0.29%
1980	30,447	−0.72%
1985	30,155	−0.19%
1990	31,285	+0.74%
1995	32,061	+0.49%
2000	33,414	+0.83%
2005	33,811	+0.24%
2010	33,060	−0.45%
2015	32,601	−0.28%
2020	32,336	−0.16%
2025	35,146	+1.68%

Source: Landesdatabank Nordrhein-Westfalen (1965-2025)

== Twin towns – sister cities ==
Jülich is twinned with:

- Haubourdin, France (1964)
- Taicang, China (2017)

== Transport ==
- BAB 4 (Düren / Jülich Interchange)
- BAB 44
  - (Jülich Ost (East)/ Mersch Interchange)
  - (Jülich West (West)/ Koslar Interchange)
- Rurtalbahn, literally the Rur Valley Railway (Linnich - Jülich - Düren - Heimbach)

== Culture and landmarks ==
=== Museums ===
- Historical Town Museum

=== Buildings ===
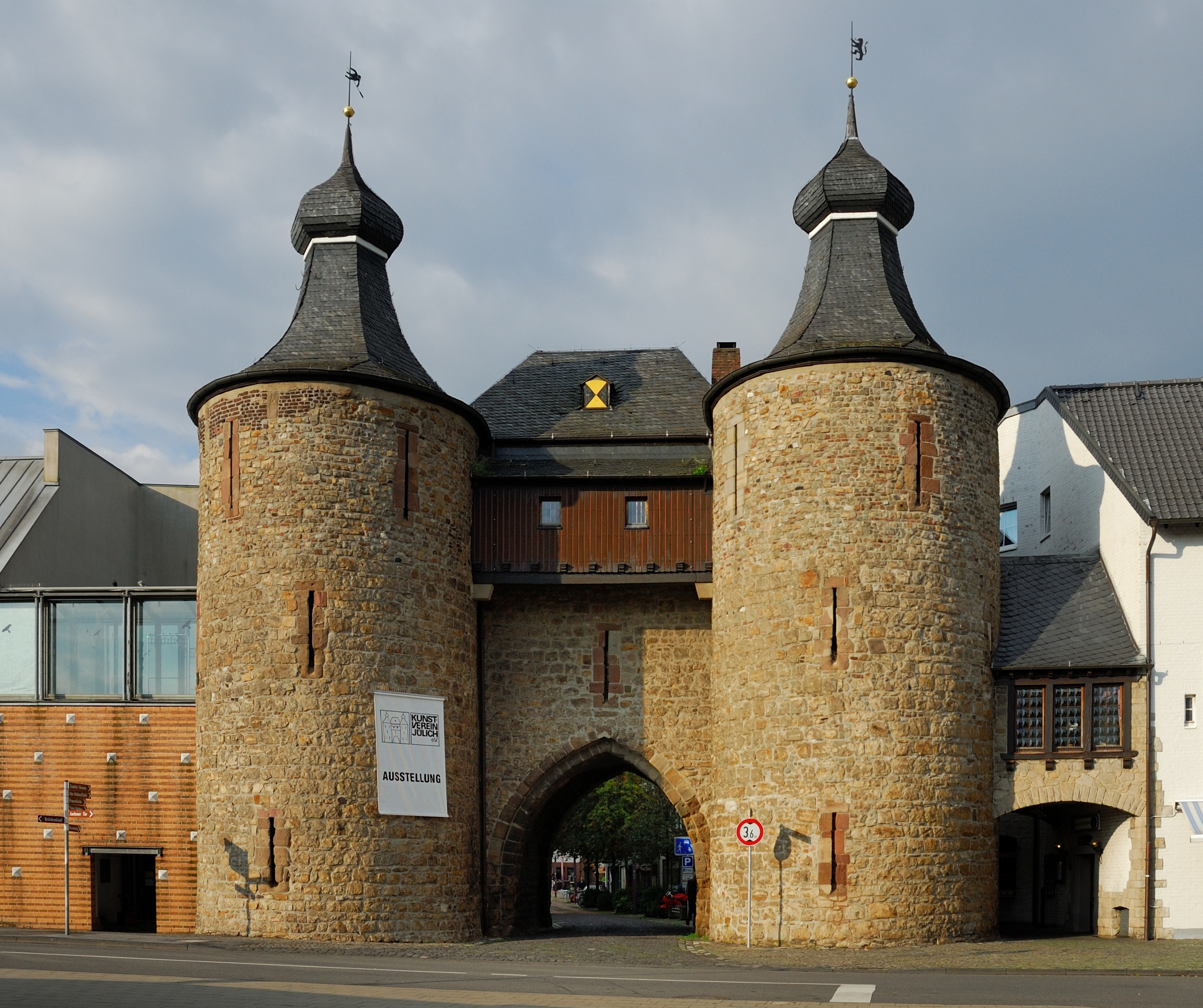
Hexenturm Jülich, a town landmark

Particularly notable:

- the Witchtower (Hexenturm)
- the Citadel
- the Napoleonic Bridgehead
- the Church of the Assumption
- the Aachener Tor (lit. Aachen Gate)
- aerial towers of shortwave broadcasting facility

=== Shortwave broadcasting facility ===
In 1956 the WDR broadcaster established the first short wave transmitter near the borough of Mersch. In subsequent years this site was expanded. On September 1, 1961, this site was handed over to the German Federal Post for establishing the German foreign broadcasting service, "Deutsche Welle". In the course of time 10 transmitters of 100 kilowatts were installed, and transmitting antennas were installed, consisting of enormous dipole arrays between free-standing steel framework towers. Later these transmitters were rented predominantly to non-German broadcasting organisations. In the 90's on the area of the shortwave transmission facility a medium wave transmitter was also installed, using a long wire antenna which was mounted on a tower on the transmitter site. It was intended to be used for transmitting the programmes of radio Viva on 702 kHz, but it never went into regular service for this broadcaster. From December 6, 2004, to May 2006, the medium-wave transmitter was used to broadcast the output of the German commercial broadcaster "TruckRadio" on 702 kHz. In 2006 the shortwave-facilities were sold to the British entrepreneur Robert Edmiston and his Christian Vision-organization. However, on October 24, 2009, the site was shut down and antennas and transmitters were subsequently dismantled.

=== Miscellaneous ===
The reliquaries of Christina von Stommeln.

=== Sport ===
Jülich-based sports teams are TTC Jülich (table tennis, which competes in the Bundesliga, the domestic premiere league) and the SC Jülich 1910, an amateur football (soccer) club that won the German national amateur championships in 1969, 1970 and 1971.

=== Healthcare ===
St. Elisabeth Hospital

On November 19, 1891, the St. Elisabeth Hospital Jülich was opened. It was completely destroyed in World War II, but was rebuilt in 1946 and expanded over the following years: in 1950, an eye and an ENT department were set up, and in 1959 the specialist department for gynecology and obstetrics. There has been a nursing school since 1964. In 2003 an outpatient surgery center and in 2006 a new ward block were built. It is a 156-bed hospital with 300 employees.

The sponsors were from 1891 to 1963 the city of Jülich, from 1963 to 1987 the Caritas association for the diocese of Aachen, from 1987 to 2010 the Malteser St. Elisabeth gGmbH and since 2010 it has been the Caritas Trägergesellschaft West gGmbH

Rescue service The German Red Cross and the Malteser Hilfsdienst operate the rescue service in Jülich. The district of Düren (RDKD) has commissioned them to carry out the rescue service. The rescue stations are located in Jülich (DRK) and in the district of Mersch (MHD). The emergency vehicle is at the Jülich hospital.

== Notable people ==
- Alessandro Pasqualini, Italian Renaissance architect
- Bobby Julich, American Cycling Star has traced his family ancestry back to Jülich
- In the Netherlands, the name Van Gulik is quite common, e.g. the much translated author Robert van Gulik. But one also finds variants like: Van Gulick, Van de(r) Gulik (cf David Van Der Gulik), Guliks, Gulickx, Gulikers, and Jülicher
- Nikolaus von Maillot de la Treille, the Bavarian war minister, was born in Jülich

=== Citizens ===
- Johann Wilhelm Schirmer (1807–1863), landscape artist
- Antonius Fischer (1840–1912), archbishop and cardinal
- Dürbeck & Dohmen, composer duo, René Dohmen (born 1966) and Joachim Dürbeck (born 1967)
- Axel Fuchs (born 1967), mayor of Jülich
- Robert Leipertz (born 1993), football player
- Heinz-Günther Nesselrath (born 1957), philologist
- Goswin Nickel (1582–1664), 10th Superior-General of the Jesuits
- Gregory P. Unholt (born 1937), Jülich-born, German-American computer scientist

=== Associated with the town ===
- Grünberg, Peter (born 1939), physicist, Nobel Prize 2007
- Gracht, Heiko Andreas von der, German economist, futurist, and non-fiction author

== Literature ==
- Guido von Büren (Hrsg.): Jülich Stadt - Territorium - Geschichte], Kleve 2000, ISBN 3-933969-10-7
- Ulrich Coenen: Von Juliacum bis Jülich. Die Baugeschichte der Stadt und ihrer Vororte von der Antike bis zu Gegenwart, 2. Aufl., Aachen 1989. ISBN 3-925714-17-0
- Ulrich Coenen: Stadt Jülich = Rheinische Kunststätten, Heft 368, Neuss 1991. ISBN 3-88094-696-5
- Conrad Doose/Siegfried Peters: Renaissancefestung Jülich, 1998, ISBN 3-87227-058-3
- Ulrich Eckardt/Wolfgang Hommel/Werner Katscher: Flug über Jülich, 2003, ISBN 3-87227-076-1
- Wolfgang Hommel: Stadtführer Jülich, 1998, ISBN 3-87227-065-6
- Wolfgang Hommel: Jülich im Aufbruch - Landesgartenschau und Stadtentwicklungsprogramm Jülich '98, 1998, ISBN 3-87227-098-2
- Dr. Erwin Fuchs/Wolfgang Hommel: Die Jülicher und ihre Wurzeln, 1997, ISBN 3-87227-063-X
- Eva Behrens-Hommel: Sagen und Überlieferungen des Jülicher Landes, 1996, ISBN 3-87227-061-3
- Eva Behrens-Hommel: Mundartsammlung des Jülicher Landes, 1997, ISBN 3-87227-062-1
- Hartwig Neumann: Stadt und Festung Jülich auf bildlichen Darstellungen, Bonn 1991. ISBN 3-7637-5863-1
- Gabriele Spelthahn: An der Synagoge - Jülich und der Holocaust, 1997, ISBN 3-930808-08-0
