= Van Gulik =

Van Gulik (also Van Gulick and Van der Gulik) is a Dutch toponymic surname, meaning "from Gulik" (Duchy of Jülich). The counts and dukes of Jülich were named "van Gulik" in the local Meuse-Rhenish dialect. Other notable people with the surname include:

- David Van der Gulik (born 1983), Canadian ice hockey player
- Dirk-Willem van Gulik (born 1968), Dutch businessman
- Robert van Gulik (1910–1967), Dutch orientalist, diplomat, musician, and writer
- Willem van Gulik (died 1304), Flemish revolt leader

== See also ==
- Gulick, an Anglicised version of the surname
