= Alice Gordon Gulick =

American Protestant missionary and pedagogue (1847–1903)

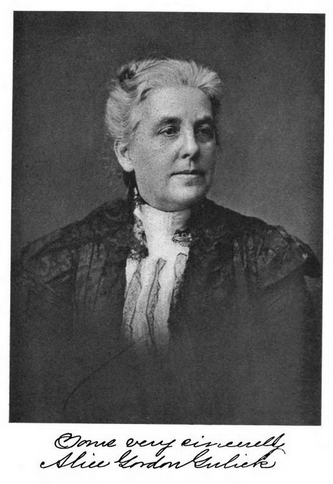
Alice Gordon Gulick, from a posthumous biography published in 1917.

Alice Gordon Gulick (August 8, 1847 — September 14, 1903) was an American missionary teacher in Spain.

== Early life ==
Alice Winfield Gordon was born in Boston, Massachusetts, and raised in Auburndale, Massachusetts, the daughter of James M. Gordon and Mary Clarkson Gordon. Her parents were active in the abolition movement; her sisters Anna Adams Gordon and Elizabeth Putnam Gordon were temperance activists. She attended Mount Holyoke Seminary from 1863 to 1867.

== Career ==
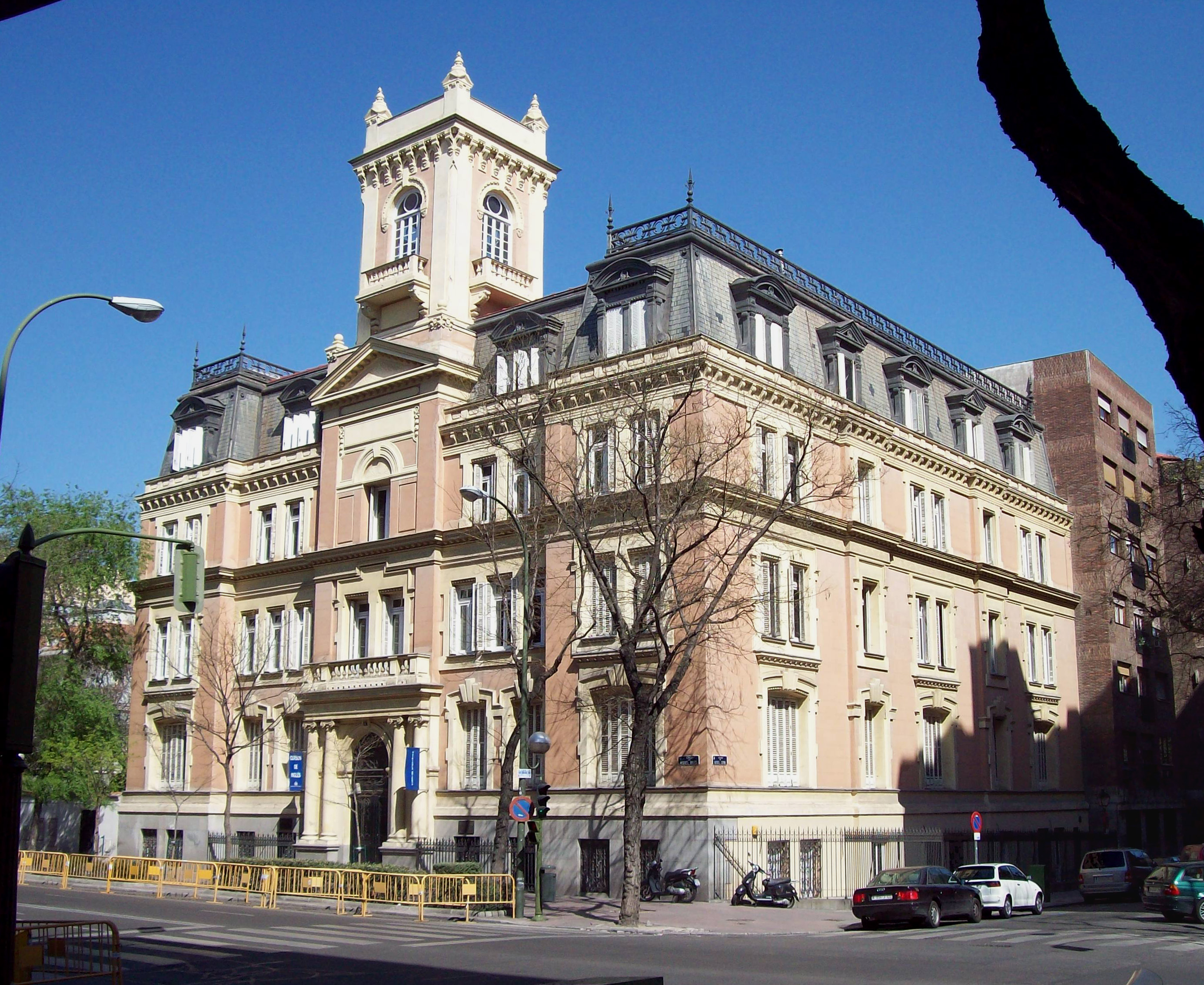
Instituto Internacional (Madrid) 01

Alice Gordon Gulick became a missionary in Spain soon after marrying her second husband, William Hooker Gulick, in 1871. His parents, Peter Johnson Gulick and Fanny Gulick, were missionaries in the Hawaiian Kingdom.

Alice and William ran an elementary school at Santander, Spain, then at San Sebastián, and a boarding school to train older girls to be teachers. Alice Gulick translated Protestant hymns into Spanish, and carried many of her ideas about women's education from her time at Mount Holyoke, encouraging her students to pursue further studies. Jane Addams visited the Gulicks and wrote, "The school has evoked and at the same time filled a wonderful opportunity in Spain and should have the cooperation of all women interested in the higher education of women."

In 1894, Mount Holyoke College gave Gulick one of its first honorary degrees, in recognition of her work for women's education. Mary E. Woolley, the college president, declared, "If Mount Holyoke had never sent out another alumna except Mrs. Gulick, it would have justified its existence." In 1895, two of her students passed examinations at the University of Madrid with high marks, a newsworthy achievement for the women.

In 1898, Gulick returned to the United States with her daughter Grace, to raise funds for their work in Spain. During her time in America, she was made Dean of Women for Cuban teachers studying at Harvard College. Gulick was also the founder and head of the World's Woman's Christian Temperance Union (WWCTU) when it began in Spain in 1891.

The Gulicks moved their women's college, the Instituto Internacional, to Madrid in 1903, but Alice Gulick was already ill with tuberculosis when that move was undertaken, and she did not live to see the school's success at its new location.

A building on the campus was named for Alice Gordon Gulick in 1910.

== Personal life ==
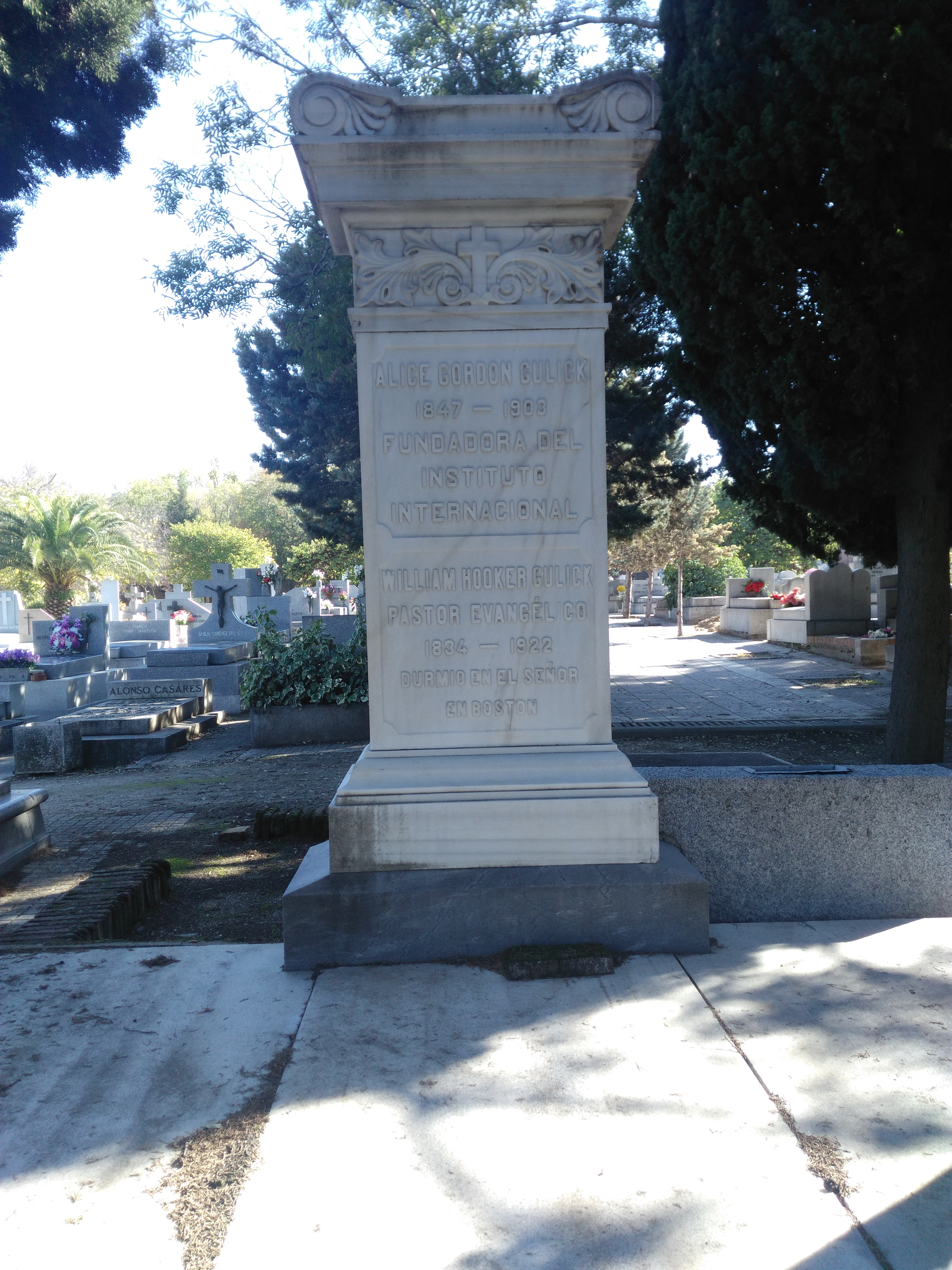
Tomb of Alice Gordon Gulick, in Madrid

Alice Gordon married an Amherst College instructor, Alva Bayless Kittredge, in 1870; he died the next day, from tuberculosis. In 1871, Alice Gordon married again, to Rev. William Hooker Gulick, a graduate of the Punahou School and a son of missionary Peter Johnson Gulick. They had seven children, three of whom died in childhood; two sons, James and Frederick, died as young adults. Only two of her children, daughters Grace and Elizabeth, survived Alice.

Alice Gordon Gulick died in London in 1903, aged 56 years. Her grave is in Madrid. Her sister Elizabeth Putnam Gordon published a biography of Alice Gordon Gulick in 1917, including a poem dedicated to Gulick by Katharine Lee Bates.

Her papers are archived at Mount Holyoke College. Her institute remains in Madrid, as a center of cultural exchange and as a historic site. There is also a park named for her in San Sebastián.
