= J. T. Gulick =

American missionary and naturalist (1832–1923)

John Thomas Gulick
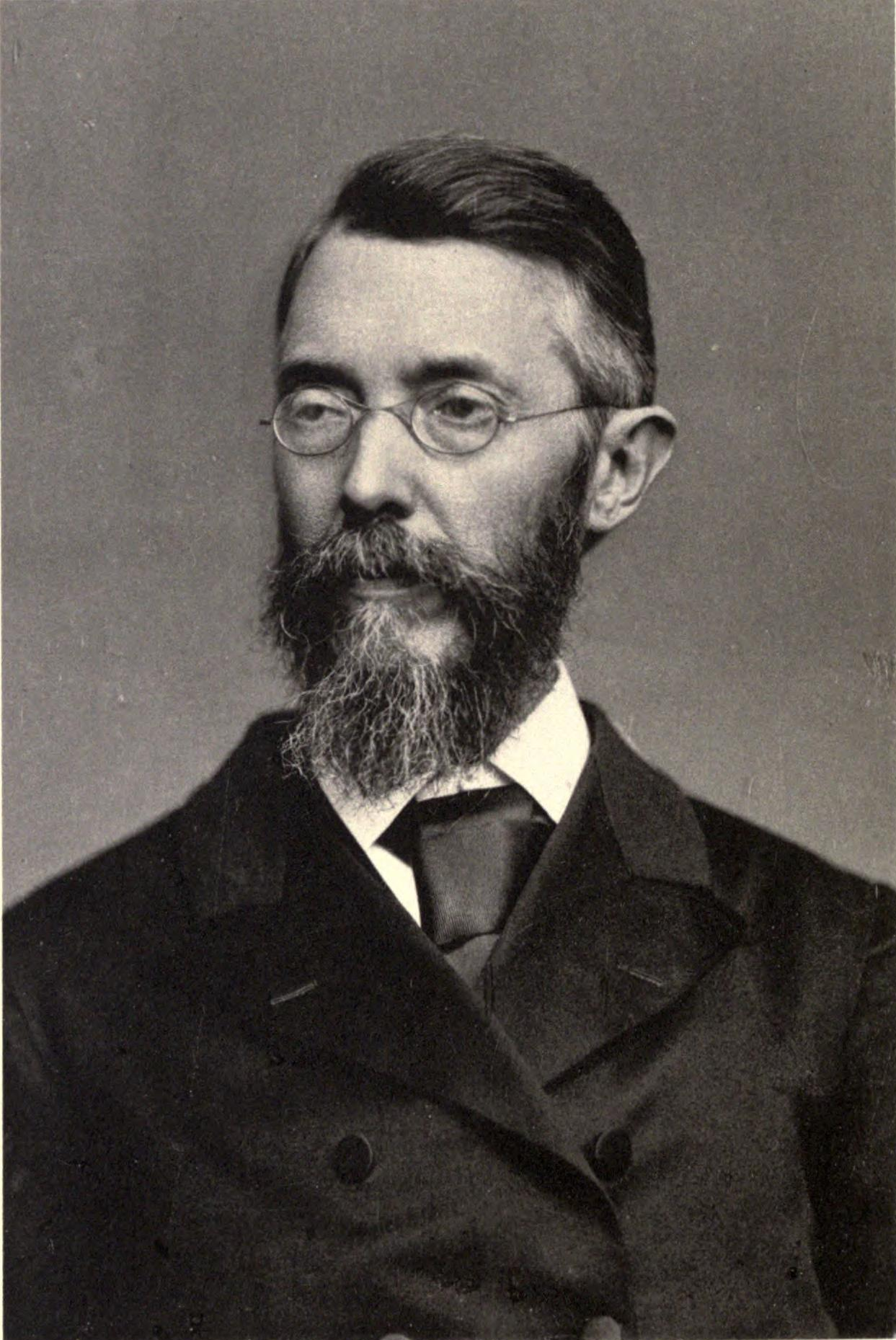
- Born: March 13, 1832; Kauaʻi Island, Hawaii
- Died: April 14, 1923 (aged 91); Honolulu, Hawaii
- Citizenship: Hawaiian, American
- Education: Williams College
- Known for: Evolutionary study of snails
- Scientific career
- Fields: Evolutionary Biology

Signature
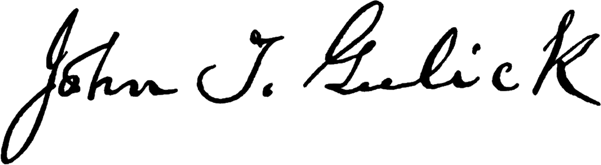

John Thomas Gulick (March 13, 1832 – April 14, 1923) was an American missionary and naturalist from Hawaii. He was one of the pioneers of modern evolutionary thinking based on his studies of Hawaiian snails of the genus Achatinella. He was among the first to describe the formation of species through geographic separation of breeding populations. He developed early ideas on the founder effect and what is now known as the Baldwin effect. He coined the term "divergent evolution".

== Life ==
Gulick was born in Waimea on Kauaʻi Island, during the Kingdom of Hawaii. His father was missionary Peter Johnson Gulick (1796–1877) and mother was Fanny Hinckley Thomas Gulick (1798–1883). Early in life he went to Oregon and sought gold in California. In 1851, he started to collect and study Hawaiian land snails. He had been interested in snails (a field now known as Conchology) since his early teens, and developed independently the concept of their evolution. He discovered many species of snails were only found in very specific areas within the islands, and there was no overlap between these areas.

In 1853, after reading Charles Darwin's The Voyage of the Beagle and Hugh Miller's The Footprints of the Creator, Gulick presented his paper, "The Distribution of Plants and Animals", to the Punahou School Debating Society. In 1855, he enrolled for one year at New York University and then Williams College in Massachusetts, and studied in their Lyceum of Natural History. In 1859, he was elected Lyceum President, and graduated with an A.B. degree.

He then followed the family tradition of attending theological school at Williams College (1859) and enrolled in Union Theological Seminary in New York City from 1859 to 1861. While there, he read Darwin's On the Origin of Species. He then collected shells in Panama and Japan.

On August 22, 1864, Gulick was ordained as a missionary in China, but also continued his study of snails. On September 3, 1864, he married Emily de la Cour. In 1872, he wrote "On the Variation of Species as Related to Their Geographical Distribution, Illustrated by the Achatinellinae", which was published in the journal Nature. In 1872, he traveled to England for two years. While there, he corresponded with Charles Darwin regarding his studies. He finally met Darwin and gave him a synopsis of an upcoming paper. That paper was "On Diversity of Evolution Under One Set of External Conditions", which was published in the Journal of the Linnean Society of London, Zoology in 1873. Gulick then returned to China, and remained there until 1875.

After his first wife died in 1875, he moved to Japan to continue missionary work. As in China, he studied snails while performing as a missionary. On May 31, 1880, he married Frances Amelia Stevens (1848–1928). In 1888, he went again to London where his paper "Divergent Evolution Through Cumulative Segregation" was published in the Journal of the Linnean Society of London, Zoology. He met George Romanes who worked with Gulick to refine evolutionary biology. In 1889, he received an honorary A.M. and Ph.D from Adelbert College of Western Reserve University. In 1891, another paper, "Intensive Segregation, or Divergence Through Independent Transformation" was published in the Journal of the Linnean Society of London, Zoology.

He moved to Oberlin, Ohio in 1899. He expanded his study to societal evolution in humans, coming to believe societal evolution could be attributed to altruistic motives and a spirit of cooperation between humanity. He put forth this thesis in his paper "Evolution, Racial and Habitudinal" in 1905 and received an honorary Ph.D. by Oberlin College.

Later in 1905, he returned to Hawaii and sold his shell collection to Charles Montague Cooke Jr. the new curator of the Bernice P. Bishop Museum. He remained there until his death in Honolulu on April 14, 1923. He and his second wife are buried in the Mission Houses cemetery. They had two children, Addison and Louise (Gulick) Whitaker.

== Evolutionary theories ==
In 1872, Gulick was the first to propose the theory that the majority of evolutionary changes are the result of chance variation, which has no effect on the survival and reproductive success of a species (today called "genetic drift"). He came to this theory while noting that there was a large diversity of local populations of Hawaiian land snails (Achatinella) which showed random variation under seemingly identical environmental conditions. Although he certainly promoted the importance of random factors in evolution, he also was a strong supporter of Darwinian natural selection, and this led to disagreement with Moritz Wagner's "Migration Theory" of the origin of species.

In 1888, Gulick introduced new terms for two patterns of evolution that can be observed: the term monotypic evolution (previously called "transformation;" today "anagenesis") and the term "polytypic evolution" (previously called "diversification"; today "cladogenesis") – simultaneous processes, such as the multiplication of species, manifested by different populations and incipient species. George Romanes later adopted this terminology during his evolutionary studies.

Gulick later proposed general geographic models of speciation, and disputed Moritz Wagner's more extreme claims that geographic speciation was the only possible route to speciation.

Romanes said of Gulick:

...to his essays on the subject I attribute a higher value than to any other work in the field of Darwinian thought since the date of Darwin's death.

== Criticism ==
Gulick reported collecting 44,500 Hawaiian snails in just three years. Some were of no scientific value because he did not record where they were obtained. Of many of the species he collected, no similar species remain in the wild today. Some modern observers attribute the extinction of many endemic Hawaiian snail species to him and fellow collectors such as his schoolmate David Dwight Baldwin.

== Family tree ==
Gulick family tree

Peter Johnson Gulick (1796–1877)	Fanny Hinckley Thomas (1798–1883)
Luther Halsey Gulick Sr. (1828–1891)	Orramel Hinckley Gulick (1830–1923)	John Thomas Gulick (1832–1923)	William Hooker Gulick (1835–1922)
Theodore Weld Gulick (1837–1924)
Thomas Lafron Gulick (1839–1904)
Julia Ann Eliza Gulick (1845–1936)
Sarah Frances Gulick (1854–1937)	Sidney Gulick (1860–1945)	Luther Gulick (1865–1918)
Luther Halsey Gulick (1892–1993)	Sidney Lewis Gulick Jr. (1902–1988)	Frances Jewett Gulick (1891–1936)
Denny Gulick

== Works ==
- Gulick, John Thomas (1905). Evolution: racial and habitudinal. Carnegie Institution of Washington publication. Vol. 25. Washington, DC: Carnegie Institution of Washington. OCLC 62826820.
- Gulick, John T (July 1873). "On diversity of evolution under one set of external conditions". Journal of the Linnean Society of London, Zoology. 11 (56): 496–505. doi:10.1111/j.1096-3642.1873.tb01670.x. ISSN 1096-3642. (subscription required)
- Gulick, John Thomas (September 1888). "Divergent evolution through cumulative segregation". Journal of the Linnean Society of London, Zoology. 20 (120): 189–274. doi:10.1111/j.1096-3642.1888.tb01445.x. ISSN 1096-3642. OCLC 81568189.
- Gulick, J. T. (1872-06-18). "On the Variation of Species as Related to their Geographical Distribution". Nature. 6 (142). Illustrated by The Achatinellinae: 222–224. doi:10.1038/006222b0. ISSN 0028-0836. OCLC 01586310.
- Gulick, J. T.; Smith, Edgar A. (1873). "Description of new Species of Achatinellinae". Proceedings of the Zoological Society of London: 73. ISSN 1469-7998. OCLC 818889019.
- Gulick, J. T.; Smith, Edgar A. (1873). "On the classification of the Achatinellinae". Proceedings of the Zoological Society of London: 89–91. ISSN 1469-7998. OCLC 818889019.
