= Denny Gulick =

American mathematician (born 1936)

Denny Gulick (born Sidney Lewis Gulick III, July 29, 1936) is an emeritus professor of mathematics at University of Maryland, College Park.

== Life ==
Gulick graduated from Oberlin College, Ohio, then obtained his PhD from Yale University, with his main interest of operator theory. He was the undergraduate chair of the Mathematics Department at the University of Maryland and was active in statewide college education and policies.

He has written several textbooks, including Encounters with Chaos (1992) and six editions of Calculus with Analytic Geometry, with fellow University of Maryland math professor Robert Ellis.

== Works ==
- with Robert Ellis (2002) [1982]. Calculus with analytic geometry (sixth ed.). Saunders College Publishing. ISBN 978-0-12-237400-5.
- Denny Gulick (1992). Encounters with chaos. McGraw-Hill. ISBN 978-0-07-025203-5.
