= Presidential reorganization authority =

Temporary authority granted by the US Congress

Presidential reorganization authority is a term used to refer to a major statutory power that has sometimes been temporarily extended by the United States Congress to the President of the United States. It permits the president to divide, consolidate, abolish, or create agencies of the U.S. federal government by presidential directive, subject to limited legislative oversight. First granted in 1932, presidential reorganization authority has been extended to nine presidents on 16 separate occasions. As of 2024, it was most recently granted to Ronald Reagan.

Presidential reorganization authority is designed to allow periodic refinement of the organizational efficiency of the government through significant and sweeping modifications to its architecture that might otherwise be too substantial to realistically implement through a parliamentary process.

== Overview ==
The customary method by which agencies of the United States government are created, abolished, consolidated, or divided is through an act of Congress. The presidential reorganization authority essentially delegates these powers to the president for a defined period of time, permitting the President to take those actions by decree. A method of limited oversight has generally been included in past cases of presidential reorganization authority; usually, reorganization plans issued pursuant to the authority can be nullified by an act of Congress during a fixed window of time following promulgation of the orders. In other words, should Congress take no action in response to an reorganization plan issued under the authority, then the plan becomes law. This is different from the normal process of lawmaking, in which laws take effect with congressional action, not in the absence of action, and has been colloquially called the "legislative veto".

Presidential reorganization authority is designed to allow periodic refinement of the organizational efficiency of the government through significant and sweeping modifications to its architecture that might otherwise be too substantial to realistically implement through a parliamentary process.

First fully extended in 1932, presidential reorganization authority has been authorized on 16 occasions. The Reorganization Act of 1949 was the last full statute enacted from scratch until the Reorganization Act of 1977; reorganizations occurring between the 1949 and 1977 statutes took the form of amendment and extension of the 1949 law.

As of 2017, the last major reorganization of the government using presidential reorganization authority was during the administration of Dwight Eisenhower. All subsequent cases of the invocation of presidential reorganization authority has been to make more minor, corrective adjustments.

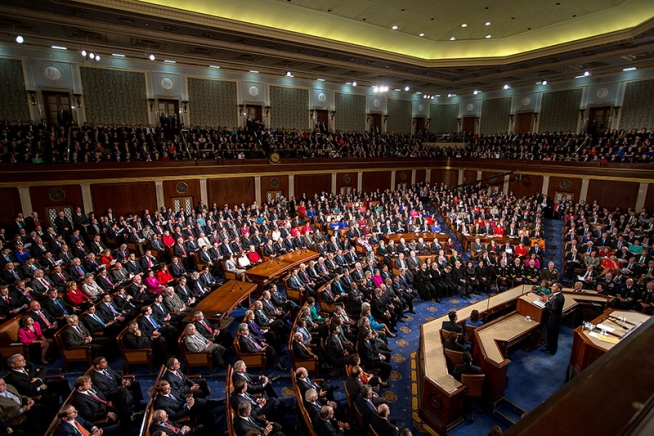
While the U.S. Constitution grants the president broad powers, Congress (pictured during a 2013 joint session) reserves some authority over the design and organization of the executive branch.

== Legal basis ==
The U.S. Constitution establishes an Executive Branch of government. It is, therefore, left to normal statute law to establish inferior offices and agencies, under the President, by which the government can operate.

Despite the broad authority granted by the United States Constitution to the president, they do not have "unilateral and unrestrained authority over the Executive Branch" and "congressional action is required to create Executive Branch departments, to fund them, to determine the nature and scope of their duties and to confirm the appointment of their top leaders". While the president manages the conduct of executive branch offices, "it is Congress, not the President, that establishes departments and agencies, and to whatever degree it chooses, the internal organization of agencies".

=== Delegation of legislative authority ===
The nondelegation doctrine is a principle that the Congress, being vested with "all legislative powers" by Article One, Section 1 of the United States Constitution, cannot delegate that power to anyone else. However, the Supreme Court ruled in J. W. Hampton, Jr. & Co. v. United States (1928) that congressional delegation of legislative authority is an implied power of Congress that is constitutional so long as Congress provides an "intelligible principle" to guide the executive branch: "'In determining what Congress may do in seeking assistance from another branch, the extent and character of that assistance must be fixed according to common sense and the inherent necessities of the government co-ordination.' So long as Congress 'shall lay down by legislative act an intelligible principle to which the person or body authorized to [exercise the delegated authority] is directed to conform, such legislative action is not a forbidden delegation of legislative power.'"

=== Unicameral legislative veto ===
A unicameral legislative veto has been a feature of the oversight authority built into several instances of presidential reorganization authority. United States Attorney-General William D. Mitchell early expressed concern that the Economy Act of 1932, the first instance of presidential reorganization authority, was unconstitutional on the basis of it allowing the exercise of the so-called "legislative veto" by only one chamber of Congress. The act provided that either the Senate or the House of Representatives could annul an executive order issued by the president under the reorganization authority. In Mitchell's view, a single chamber of Congress was constitutionally incompetent to act by itself; the legislative power could only be exercised by the two chambers jointly, he argued. The question was not immediately tested in court. However, in the 1983 case of Immigration and Naturalization Service v. Chadha, the U.S. Supreme Court essentially affirmed Mitchell's earlier opinion that a one-house legislative veto was unconstitutional. The decision in Immigration and Naturalization Service v. Chadha created the possibility that every previous reorganization was effectively null and void; to avoid the potential administrative chaos that might have ensued, Congress enacted legislation retroactively approving all previous reorganizations.

== History ==
=== Background ===
The creation of presidential reorganization authority was foreshadowed with the passage of the Overman Act in 1918, which allowed the president to consolidate government agencies, though abolishing any specific department was prohibited.

=== Economy Act of 1932 ===
The Economy Act of 1932 (47 Stat. 413) was passed in response to Hoover's frustration at the lack of cooperation from Congress in refining aspects of the administrative structure of the government and his concern that any proposal he advanced would be "amended beyond recognition". Hoover issued 11 executive orders under the Economy Act of 1932 on December 9, 1932. All were nullified by resolutions of disapproval on January 19, 1933.

The Amendments of 1933 (47 Stat. 1517; 48 Stat. 8) to the Economy Act granting presidential reorganization authority to Franklin D. Roosevelt were made at the urging of Herbert Hoover before he left office. In contrast to the original legislation, however, the reorganization authority granted by the 73rd Congress "all but eliminated the ability of Congress to prevent such orders from taking effect" short of enacting a new law. Roosevelt used the authority to create the Office of National Parks, Buildings, and Reservations in the United States Department of the Interior; abolish the United States Shipping Board; merge the Bureau of Immigration and Bureau of Naturalization into the Immigration and Naturalization Service; abolish the Board of Indian Commissioners, transferring its authority to the U.S. Department of the Interior; and consolidate several disparate government farm credit agencies into the Farm Credit Administration.

=== Reorganization Act of 1939 ===
The Reorganization Act of 1939 (53 Stat. 561) defined the reorganization plan as its own kind of presidential directive. Previously, the delegated authority had been exercised using executive orders.

Roosevelt's Reorganization Plan No. 1 and Reorganization Plan No. 2 substantially reorganized a number of federal agencies. It created several agencies:

- The Federal Security Agency, bringing together the Social Security Board, U.S. Employment Service, Office of Education, Public Health Service, National Youth Administration, and Civilian Conservation Corps
- The Federal Works Agency, bringing together the Bureau of Public Roads, Public Buildings Branch of the Procurement Division, Branch of Buildings Management of the National Park Service, United States Housing Authority, Federal Emergency Administration of Public Works, and Works Progress Administration
- The Federal Loan Agency, bringing together the Reconstruction Finance Corporation, the Electric Home and Farm Authority, Federal Home Loan Bank Board, Federal Housing Administration, and Export-Import Bank of the United States.

The plan also transferred the Farm Credit Administration, Federal Farm Mortgage Corporation, and Commodity Credit Corporation to the United States Department of Agriculture. One later criticism of Roosevelt's actions is that they further reduced the influence and capacity of the Cabinet.

During World War II, special reorganization authority was granted to Franklin Roosevelt. However, these powers differed from what is generally considered to be presidential reorganization authority as all structural changes undertaken were to revert following the conclusion of the war.

=== Reorganization Act of 1945 ===
Harry Truman used his power under the Reorganization Act of 1945 (59 Stat. 613) to restructure some federal housing agencies. Proposals to restructure the U.S. Department of Labor were nullified by Congress.

=== Reorganization Act of 1949 ===
Truman used the Reorganization Act of 1949 to implement the recommendations of the Commission on Organization of the Executive Branch of the Government, which was chaired by former president Herbert Hoover. While most of the commission's program was ultimately implemented, eleven of the 41 reorganization plans issued by Truman to carry out the reorganization were nullified by Congress.

Under the Amendments of 1953, Eisenhower that year created the Department of Health, Education and Welfare under the orders of his Reorganization Plan No. 1.

Under the Amendments of 1955, Congress disapproved Eisenhower's plans to reorganize the research and development programs of the Department of Defense and to make the Federal Savings and Loan Insurance Corporation independent of the Federal Home Loan Bank Board.

There was another period under the Amendments of 1957.

Under the Amendments of 1961, John F. Kennedy's Reorganization Plans No. 1 and No. 2 of 1961, effecting the authority of the Securities and Exchange Commission and Federal Communications Commission, were disapproved by Congress. However, Reorganization Plan No. 2 of 1962 created the Office of Science and Technology in the Executive Office of the President.

There were two more additional periods under the Amendments of 1963 and 1965.

Nixon used his reorganization authority under the Amendments of 1969 to establish the National Oceanic and Atmospheric Administration and the Environmental Protection Agency under his Reorganization Plan No. 3.

There was another period under the Amendments of 1971.

=== Reorganization Act of 1977 ===
The Reorganization Act of 1977, originally intended to be a further series of amendments to extend the Act of 1949, ultimately materialized as its own statute. Carter used his authority under the act to create the Office of Personnel Management, the Merit Systems Protection Board, and the Federal Labor Relations Authority. A plan to create a Department of Natural Resources, by renaming the Department of the Interior and transferring into it the U.S. Forest Service from the U.S. Department of Agriculture, was ultimately never enacted after it became clear the proposal was likely to be disapproved by Congress.

There was another period under the Amendments of 1980.

In 1983 in Immigration and Naturalization Service v. Chadha the U.S. Supreme Court ruled that the one-house legislative veto was unconstitutional, causing Congress the following year to enact legislation (Pub. L. 98–532), retroactively approving all previous reorganizations.

After passing the Amendments of 1984, the Senate immediately adjourned sine die and did not reconvene until the two-month time-limit had almost passed. Because of the requirement that reorganization plans had to be forwarded to the Congress while it was in session, Reagan was unable to conduct any reorganization.

=== Later history ===
The last reorganization authority was passed by Congress in 1984, although there have been proposals to reinstate it since then.

In 2002 George W. Bush requested the president be granted permanent reorganization authority. No such authorization was extended. Also in 2002, the National Commission on the Public Service proposed extending presidential reorganization authority to substantially restructure the executive branch which, it contended, had become incoherent in the level of overlapping jurisdiction and different management structures.

During the presidency of Barack Obama, Obama requested reorganization authority from Congress which he said he would use to restructure the Department of Commerce, followed by less specific modifications to other agencies. Under Obama's plan, the National Oceanic and Atmospheric Administration would have been transferred to the Department of the Interior while the rest of the Department of Commerce would be merged with the Small Business Administration and the Office of the U.S. Trade Representative, and renamed. The authorization was not granted.

In 2025, Republicans introduced legislation to authorize President Donald Trump to reorganize the government. Although the legislation did not pass, the Trump administration ordered and implemented mass federal layoffs and engaged in a mass reorganization of the federal government, including, but not limited to reorganizing the U.S. Department of Health and Human Services, dismantling the Department of Education, reorganizing the Department of Energy, eliminating the U.S. Agency for International Development, shutting down the Corporation for Public Broadcasting, eliminating the U.S. Institute of Peace. Some of these governmental reorganizations were enacted by the DOGE effort.

== List of reorganization acts ==
President	Congress	Authorizing legislation	Time limit	Oversight procedure	Notes	References
Herbert Hoover	72nd	Economy Act of 1932 (47 Stat. 413)	eight months	Resolution of disapproval by either chamber of Congress within 60 days	11 executive orders, all nullified	
Franklin Roosevelt	73rd	Amendments of 1933 (47 Stat. 1517; 48 Stat. 8)	two years	none	Successfully created Immigration and Naturalization Service, Farm Credit Administration, and Office of National Parks, Buildings, and Reservations; abolished the United States Shipping Board and Board of Indian Commissioners	
Franklin Roosevelt	76th	Reorganization Act of 1939 (53 Stat. 561)	two years	Concurrent resolution by both chambers of Congress within 60 days	Reorganization Plan Nos. 1 and 2, creating the Federal Security Agency, Federal Works Agency, and Federal Loan Agency; also transferred a few agencies into the Department of Agriculture	
Harry Truman	79th	Reorganization Act of 1945 (59 Stat. 613)	two years	Concurrent resolution by both chambers of Congress within 60 days	Successfully restructured some federal housing agencies; proposals to restructure Department of Labor nullified by Congress	
Harry Truman	81st	Reorganization Act of 1949	four years	Concurrent resolution by both chambers of Congress within 60 days	Eleven of 41 reorganization plans were nullified by Congress	
Dwight Eisenhower	83rd	Amendments of 1953	two years	Concurrent resolution by both chambers of Congress within 60 days	Created Department of Health, Education and Welfare	
Dwight Eisenhower	84th	Amendments of 1955	two years	-	Congress disapproved reorganization of research and development programs of Department of Defense, making Federal Savings and Loan Insurance Corporation independent	
Dwight Eisenhower	85th	Amendments of 1957	two years	-	-	
John F. Kennedy	87th	Amendments of 1961	two years	-	Created Office of Science and Technology; reorganizations of the Securities and Exchange Commission and Federal Communications Commission disapproved by Congress	
Lyndon Johnson	88th	Amendments of 1963	one year	-	-	
Lyndon Johnson	89th	Amendments of 1965	three and one-half years	-	-	
Richard Nixon	91st	Amendments of 1969	one and one-half years	-	Established National Oceanic and Atmospheric Administration and Environmental Protection Agency under Reorganization Plan No. 3	
Richard Nixon	92nd	Amendments of 1971	one and one-half years	-	-	
Jimmy Carter	95th	Reorganization Act of 1977	three years	-	Created Office of Personnel Management, Merit Systems Protection Board, and Federal Labor Relations Authority. A plan to create a Department of Natural Resources failed	
Ronald Reagan	96th	Amendments of 1980	one year	Reorganization plans would take effect 90 days after promulgation provided that they were forwarded to Congress while it was in session and that, (a) each chamber of the Congress adopted a resolution approving the plan, or, (b) one chamber of the Congress adopted a resolution approving the plan while the second chamber neither approved nor disapproved, (c) neither chamber took any action on the matter	-	
Ronald Reagan	98th	Amendments of 1984	two months	Reorganization plans would take effect 90 days after promulgation provided that they were forwarded to Congress while it was in session and that, (a) each chamber of the Congress adopted a resolution approving the plan, or, (b) one chamber of the Congress adopted a resolution approving the plan while the second chamber neither approved nor disapproved, (c) neither chamber took any action on the matter	no proposals	

== See also ==
- 2025 U.S. Department of Health and Human Services reorganization
- Department of Government Efficiency
- Government organization in the first 100 days of Donald Trump's second presidency
- Imperial presidency
- National Reorganization Process
- Separation of powers under the United States Constitution
- State ownership
- United States federal executive departments
- United States presidential transition
- U.S. Public Health Service reorganizations of 1966–1973
