= Brownlow Committee =

1937 commission recommending United States federal government reforms

President's Committee on Administrative Management
Agency overview
- Formed: March 20, 1936
- Dissolved: January 11, 1937
- Jurisdiction: United States Federal
- Headquarters: Washington, D.C.
- Employees: 3 commissioners
- Minister responsible: Franklin D. Roosevelt, President
- Agency executives: Louis Brownlow, Chairman; Charles Merriam, Member; Luther Gulick, Member

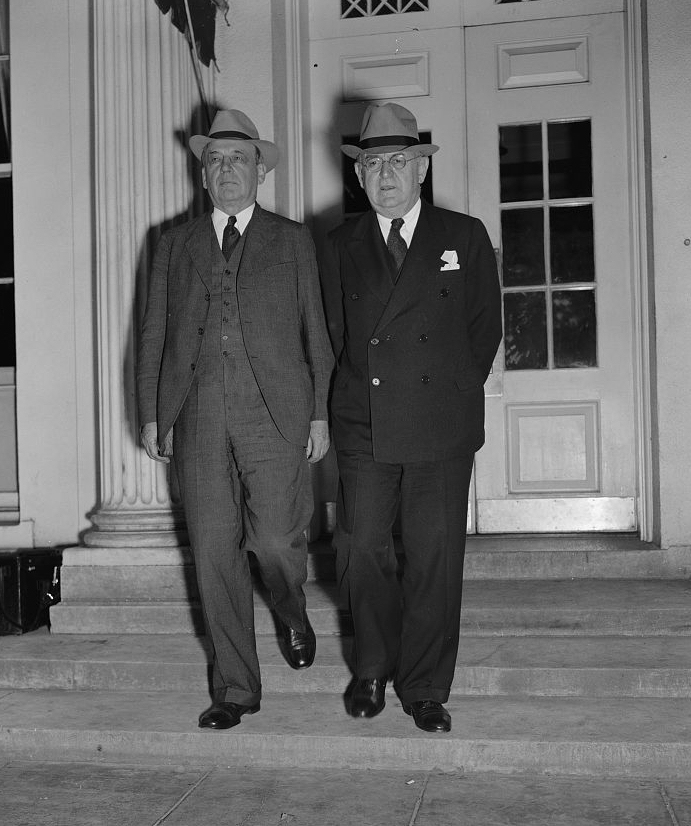
Charles Merriam (left) and Louis Brownlow, members of the Brownlow Committee, leave the White House on September 23, 1938, after they discussed government reorganization with President Roosevelt.

The President's Committee on Administrative Management, commonly known as the Brownlow Committee or Brownlow Commission, was a presidentially-commissioned panel of political science and public administration experts that in 1937 recommended sweeping changes to the executive branch of the United States government. The committee had three members: Louis Brownlow, Charles Merriam, and Luther Gulick. The staff work was managed by Joseph P. Harris, director of research for the committee.

The committee's recommendations formed the basis of the Reorganization Act of 1939 and the creation of the Executive Office of the President.

== History ==
President Franklin D. Roosevelt established the committee on March 22, 1936, and charged it with developing proposals for reorganizing the executive branch. The three-person committee consisted of Louis Brownlow, Charles Merriam, and Luther Gulick. Gulick's POSDCORB served as the basis and framing idea, and not all parts of their team's research were used. Their work revealed a profound constitutional understanding and confidence, not only about improving public management, but how to improve democracy within the American administrative state. On January 8, 1937, the committee released its report, famously declaring "The President needs help,"

Roosevelt submitted the Brownlow Committee's report to Congress and on January 12, 1937, sought legislative approval to implement the committee's recommendations.

== Recommendations ==
The committee delivered a 53-page report, which included 37 recommendations. Some of its most important recommendations included the creation of aides to the president to deal with administrative tasks of the president. It also suggested that the president should have direct control over the administrative departments. In its third suggestion, the committee said that the managerial agencies – the Civil Service Administration, the Bureau of the Budget, and the National Resources Board – should be part of the Executive Office.

The committee warned that the existing agencies had grown increasingly powerful and independent, and proposed reforms designed to tighten the president's control over these agencies. The committee proposed a plan to consolidate over 100 agencies into 12 departments and allowed the president to appoint several assistants.

The committee advocated a strong chief executive, including a significant expansion of the presidential staff, integration of managerial agencies into a single presidential office, expansion of the merit system, integration of all independent agencies into existing Cabinet departments, and modernization of federal accounting and financial practices.

== Effects ==
The Reorganization Act of 1939 incorporated two of the committee recommendations, and provided President Roosevelt with authority to make changes so that most of the existing agencies and government corporations became accountable to cabinet-level departments.

The most important results of the actions taken by Roosevelt were the creation of the Executive Office of the President and the creation of a group of six executive level assistants. Roosevelt combined several government public works and welfare agencies into the Federal Works Agency and the Federal Security Agency. He also transferred the powerful Bureau of the Budget from the Treasury Department to the Executive Office of the President. The new law also made possible in 1940, the Office of Emergency Management, which enabled the immediate creation of numerous wartime agencies. The reorganization is best known for allowing the President to appoint numerous assistants and advisers. Those who built a network of support in Congress became virtually independent "czars" in their specialized domains.

== Criticism ==
Most Americans opposed giving the president any more power, as a Gallup poll found in July 1937.

Nevertheless, after winning the approval of Congress, Roosevelt signed the Reorganization Act of 1939 and then established the Executive Office of the President, which increased the president's control over the executive branch.

== Other similar commissions ==
- Hoover Commission, two commissions in 1947–1949 and 1953–1955
- Grace Commission, (1982–1984)
- National Partnership for Reinventing Government, (1993–1998)
- Project on National Security Reform, (2006–2012)

== Precursor commissions and committees ==
- Committee on Department Methods, (1905)
- Commission on Economy and Efficiency, (1910–1913)

== See also ==
- Pendleton Civil Service Reform Act of 1883
- Civil Service Reform Act of 1978
- Public administration
- Public administration theory
