= First 100 days of the second Trump presidency =

Period from January to April 2025

- Part of the second presidency of Donald Trump
- Date: January 20, 2025 – April 30, 2025

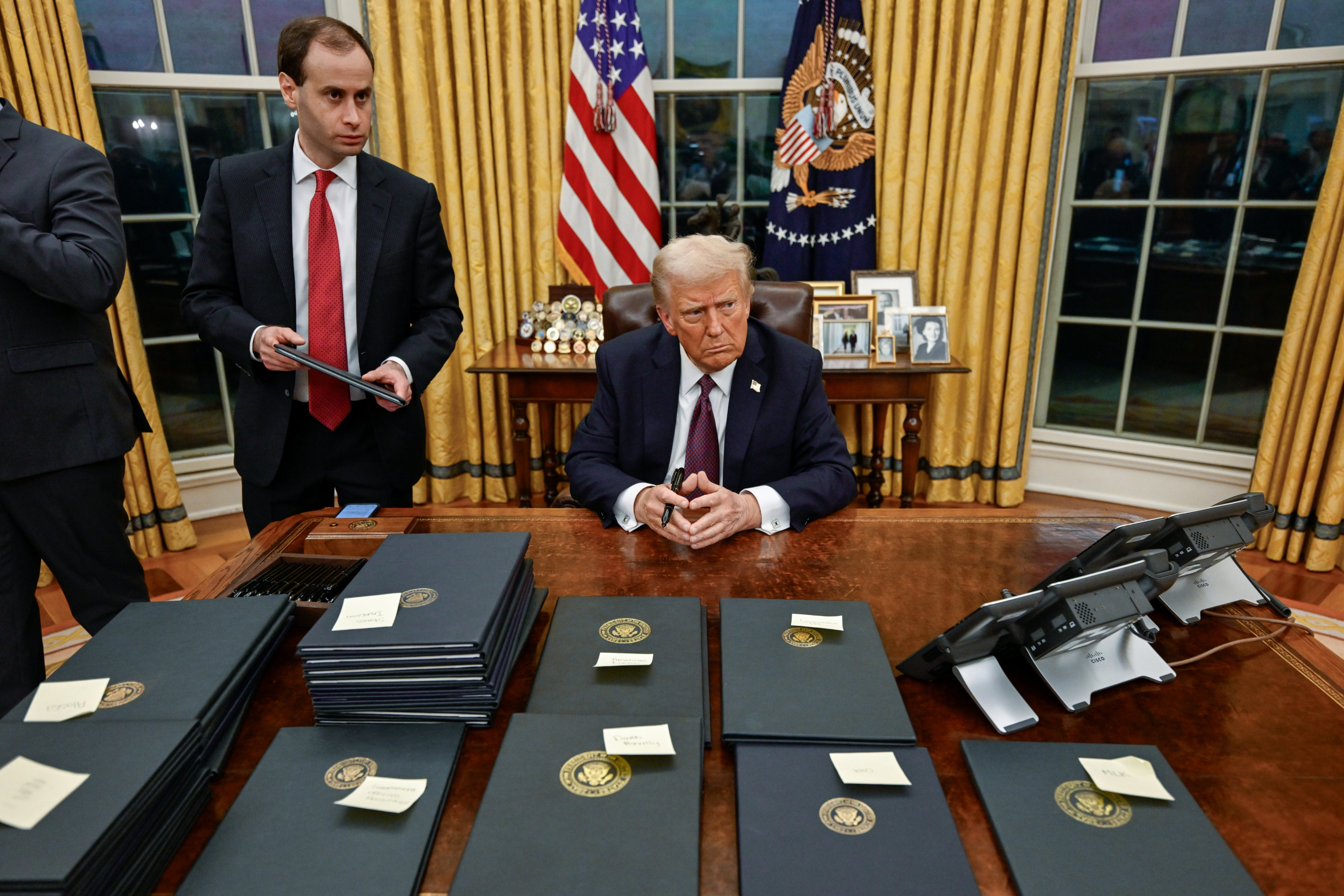
Trump signed a record 26 executive actions on the first day of his second term.

The first 100 days of the second Trump presidency began on January 20, 2025, the day Donald Trump was inaugurated as the 47th president of the United States. The first 100 days of a presidency took on symbolic significance during Franklin D. Roosevelt's first term in office, and the period is considered a benchmark to measure the early success of a president. The 100th day of Trump's second presidency was April 30, 2025.

In his first 100 days, President Trump signed 143 executive orders, the most of any president in this period, 42 proclamations, 42 memorandums, the Laken Riley Act, a continuing appropriations act, and other pieces of legislation for Congress. Trump's extensive use of executive orders drew a mixed reception from both Republicans and Democrats. Some executive orders tested the limits of executive authority, and others faced immediate legal challenges. Major topics on which Trump focused included immigration reform, deportations, applying tariffs on other countries, cutting federal spending, reducing the federal workforce, increasing executive authority, and implementing a non-interventionist foreign policy.

Trump's return to office is concurrent with the Republican Party retaining its legislative majority in the House of Representatives and securing the Senate majority in the 2024 congressional elections, marking an overall government trifecta for the GOP for the first time since the 115th Congress in 2017 at the beginning of Trump's first presidency.

== Background ==
In the 1930s, Franklin D. Roosevelt promised major reforms during his first 100 days as president of the United States amid the Great Depression. After he introduced many significant policies during that period, the events of the "first 100 days" of a presidency became a common standard by which to measure future presidents in U.S. politics.

Following his victory in the 2016 presidential election against Democratic nominee Hillary Clinton, Trump made a series of promises for the first 100 days of his first presidency, which began in 2017. His efforts to fulfill key campaign promises often stalled, were compromised, or were unsuccessful due to ongoing political polarization and infighting among his Republican Party, which had legislative majorities in Congress during the 115th Congress. Trump has also dismissed the "first 100 days" benchmark as an artificial milestone; however, he enacted many major policies and signed more executive orders in his first 100 days than any other president since Harry S. Truman. In total, he signed 28 bills, 24 executive orders, 22 memorandums, and 20 proclamations.

Following the end of his first term on January 20, 2021, after his defeat to Joe Biden in the 2020 presidential election, Trump returned to power for a second non-consecutive term upon his victory in the 2024 presidential election by defeating Kamala Harris, who replaced Biden as the Democratic nominee for President after he ended his re-election campaign. Trump said that, on the first day of his second term, he would begin the mass deportation of illegal immigrants, close the U.S. border with Mexico, reinstate the travel bans on specific countries from his first term, end the federal government's electric vehicle incentives and pro-climate subsidies, expand domestic oil production, pardon defendants of the January 6 United States Capitol Riot of 2021, end protections for gender-affirming care, and cut federal funding for schools his administration deemed "woke". Trump also promised tariffs on the U.S.'s foreign trade partners, tax cuts, and a reduction of the size of the federal government.

== Inauguration ==
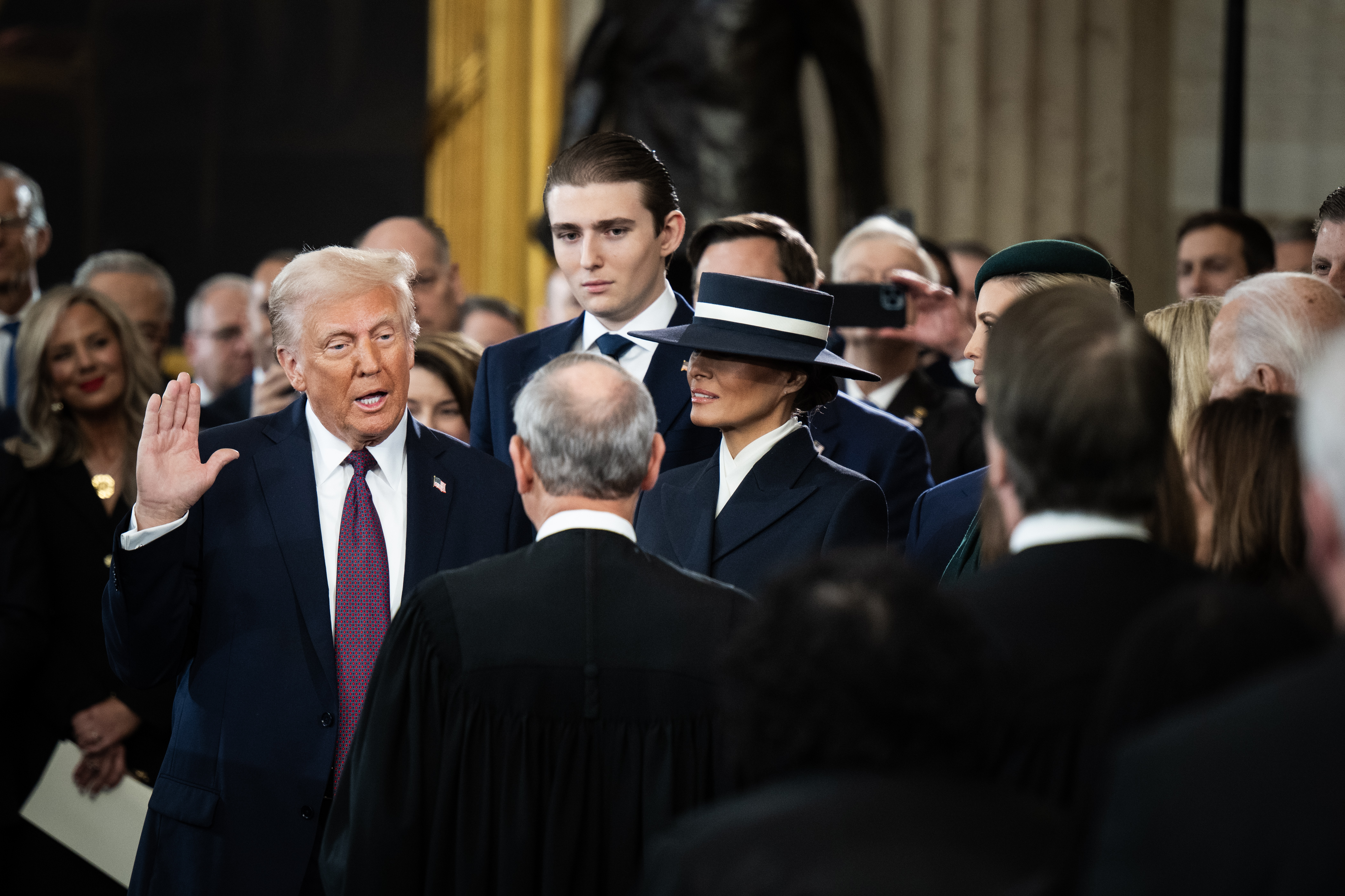
Trump takes his second oath of office, administered by Chief Justice John Roberts in the Capitol rotunda.

Trump delivers his 2025 inaugural address.

The second inauguration of Donald Trump was the 60th presidential inauguration. It took place exactly eight years after Trump's first inauguration in 2017. Donald Trump and JD Vance were formally inaugurated as the 47th President and 50th Vice President of the United States at noon on January 20, 2025, in the Capitol Rotunda, marking the start of the first 100 days of the second Trump presidency.

=== Presidential Communications ===
The content of Whitehouse.gov was switched from the Biden administration version to the second Trump administration version; the former was archived as BidenWhiteHouse. This was the fifth time the presidential website had switched between administrations and was the third switch of the White House's social media accounts. As Trump took the oath of office, the official @POTUS X (Twitter) account switched to President Trump and Joe Biden's previous tweets were moved to @POTUS46Archive. Members of the second Trump administration assumed control of numerous social media accounts while former Biden administration accounts were similarly archived such as Melania Trump assuming @FLOTUS, JD Vance assuming @VP, Usha Vance assuming @SLOTUS, Karoline Leavitt assuming @PressSec, among others. Trump's cabinet members were given new social media accounts as previous administrations had done and new executive branch websites were created while previous administration websites were transferred to the National Archives.

== Early executive actions ==
=== Executive Orders ===
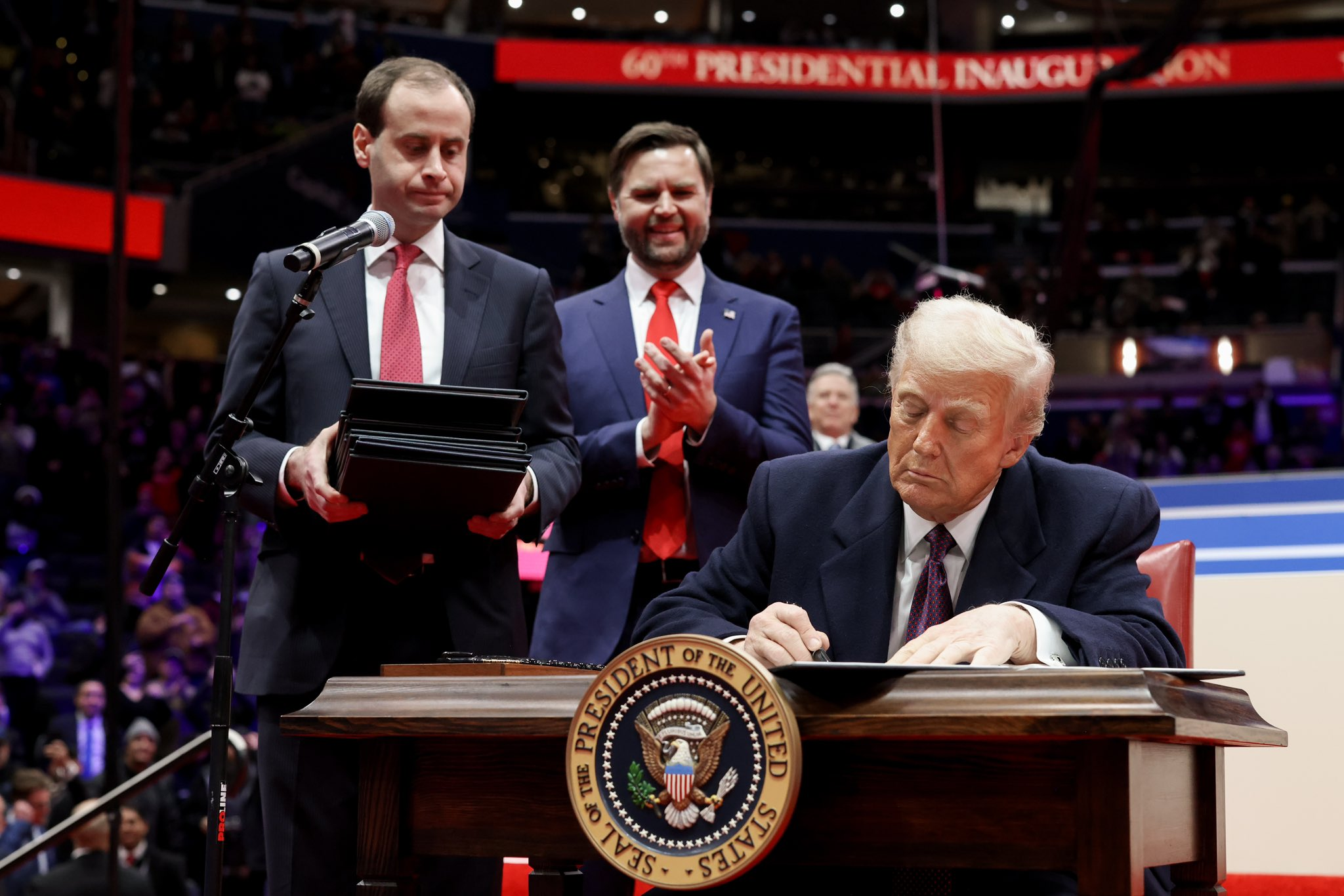
Trump signs executive orders in the Capital One Arena.

Upon taking office, Trump signed a record 26 executive orders on his first day. The orders prohibited the weaponization of federal agencies against political opponents, repealed many of Biden's executive actions, reaffirmed the existing constitutional right to free speech, banned federal censorship of online speech, banned DEI in federal agencies, encouraged energy exploration and production, ended the electric vehicle (EV) mandate, started the second withdrawal process of the U.S. from the World Health Organization and the Paris Climate Accords, declared a national energy emergency, reversed the Family Reunification Task Force, pardoned over 1,500 January 6 rioters, designated certain international drug cartels as foreign terrorist organizations, reorganized the U.S. Digital Service into the Department of Government Efficiency (DOGE), prioritized the removal and identification of illegal migrants, attempted to end birthright citizenship for children of illegal migrants born on American soil, expanded the U.S.–Mexico border wall, declared a national emergency on the southern border, delayed the impending ban of TikTok in the U.S., defined gender by an immutable male-female binary, ordered a 90 day pause on most foreign aid, revived Schedule F as Schedule Policy/Career, and ordered federal agencies to refer to the Gulf of Mexico as the "Gulf of America" and Denali as Mount McKinley.

Later executive orders attempted to ban transgender women from competing in women's sports and expand the president's control over independent agencies, symbolically declared English as the official language of the United States, and implemented a broad reciprocal tariff policy.

Four days into Trump's second term, nearly two-thirds of his executive actions mirrored or partially mirrored proposals from Project 2025, a plan published in April 2023 by The Heritage Foundation.

==== Presidential Memorandums ====
President Trump issued a total of 12 memorandums on his first day in office. These memorandums established an America First Trade Policy, began a 90-day hiring freeze (with exceptions for troops, secretaries, and others), require all government employees to work in-office and end federal remote-work, prohibit federal agencies from issuing new regulations until they are reviewed and approved, pause offshore wind projects, restart efforts to reroute water from the Sacramento–San Joaquin Delta to other parts of California, deliver emergency price relief, ensure federal buildings are visually identifiable as civic buildings, create a list of personnel eligible for TS/SCI security clearances for a six-month period, and implement improvements to California's water infrastructure.

According to some legal scholars, several of Trump's executive actions ignored or violated federal laws, regulations, and the Constitution. After multiple orders were blocked by federal judges, Trump administration officials increased their criticism of the judiciary, while some Republicans in Congress called for impeaching federal judges who ruled against Trump.

== Domestic policy ==
=== Department of Government Efficiency (DOGE) ===
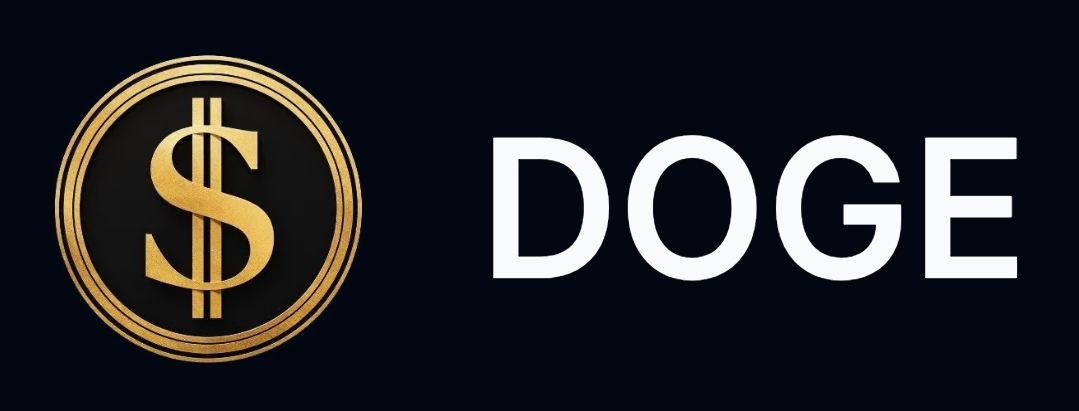
Department of Government Efficiency logo

==== Background ====
In the summer of 2024, during a X (Twitter) discussion with Trump, Elon Musk proposed the establishment of a government efficiency commission, saying, "I think it would be great to just have a government efficiency commission that takes a look at these things and just ensures that the taxpayer money, the taxpayers hard-earned money is spent in a good way. I'd be happy to help out on such a commission." During an interview with Reuters, Trump said he was open to giving Musk an advisory role in his administration and on September 5, 2024, he officially announced that "at the suggestion of Elon Musk... I will create a Government Efficiency Commission tasked with conducting a complete financial and performance audit of the entire federal government and making recommendations for drastic reforms." The New York Times compared the project to other Presidents like Theodore Roosevelt's Keep Commission, Ronald Reagan's Grace Commission, and vice president Al Gore's National Partnership for Reinventing Government. After his election victory on November 5, 2024, Trump announced that Elon Musk and Vivek Ramaswamy would serve as co-chairs of DOGE to dismantle government bureaucracy, slash excess regulations, cut wasteful expenditures, and restructure federal agencies.

Ramaswamy parted with the incoming Trump administration to pursue a run for Ohio Governor in the 2026 US elections. After being inaugurated for a second term, Trump signed an executive order formally establishing three DOGE entities. The Department of Government Efficiency, the United States DOGE Service (USDS): formed from the reorganization of the United States Digital Service, and the DOGE Service Temporary Organization, with the USDS serving as its parent organization. The DOGE Temporary Organization was given an expiration date of July 4, 2026. DOGE teams were established for federal agencies with each team consisting of four members: a team leader, an engineer, an HR specialist, and an attorney. DOGE Documents are classified as presidential records, preventing public access to the information until at least 2034.

=== Immigration policy ===
Trump made immigration policy, particularly cracking down on the United States-Mexico border crisis, a center point of his campaign, and many of his early actions focused on this issue. Upon taking office on January 20, 2025, Trump signed an array of executive orders towards immigration reform and ending much of his predecessor's policies on Immigration. Within minutes of the Second Trump presidency, the U.S. Customs and Border Protection shut down the CBP One app Throughout the early days of his presidency, Trump signed executive orders that declared a second national emergency on the southern border; enabling the deployment of armed forces and addressing the fentanyl crisis, the designation of international Drug Cartels as foreign terrorist organizations, repealing a Biden executive order that created the Family Reunification Task Force, suspending the Refugee Admissions Program for 90 days, ended the CNHV Parole Program for nationals from Cuba, Haiti, Nicaragua, and Venezuela, and attempting to end birthright citizenship for descendants of illegal immigrants who were born in America. Policies and initiatives revived from Trump's first term include Remain in Mexico, construction on the US-Mexico border, and travel bans.

On January 22, 2025, Trump revoked guidance from 2011 prohibiting illegal migrant arrests in areas such as courthouses, schools, churches, and hospitals, or during funerals and weddings. On March 1, Trump signed an executive order designating English as the official language of the United States On March 10, 2025, the Department of Homeland Security rebranded the CBP One app as CBP Home to allow illegal migrants to identify themselves and self-deport. DHS Secretary Kristi Noem announced that migrants who self-deport may have an opportunity to return to the United States legally in the future. March 13, 2025, the Trump administration requested permission from the Supreme Court to allow restrictions on birthright citizenship to partly take effect in several states while its implementation and ongoing legal battles continued. On March 15, 2025, President Trump invoked the Alien Enemies Act of 1798, the first use of such since World War II, in order to ensure the deportations of suspected members of the Venezuelan gang Tren de Aragua. A federal judge has temporarily blocked deportations under this order, citing concerns about due process. Despite this, the Trump administration still carried out the deportations of 250 suspected gang members to El Salvador, citing security concerns.

==== Laken Riley Act and expansion of the Guantanamo Migrant Operations Center ====
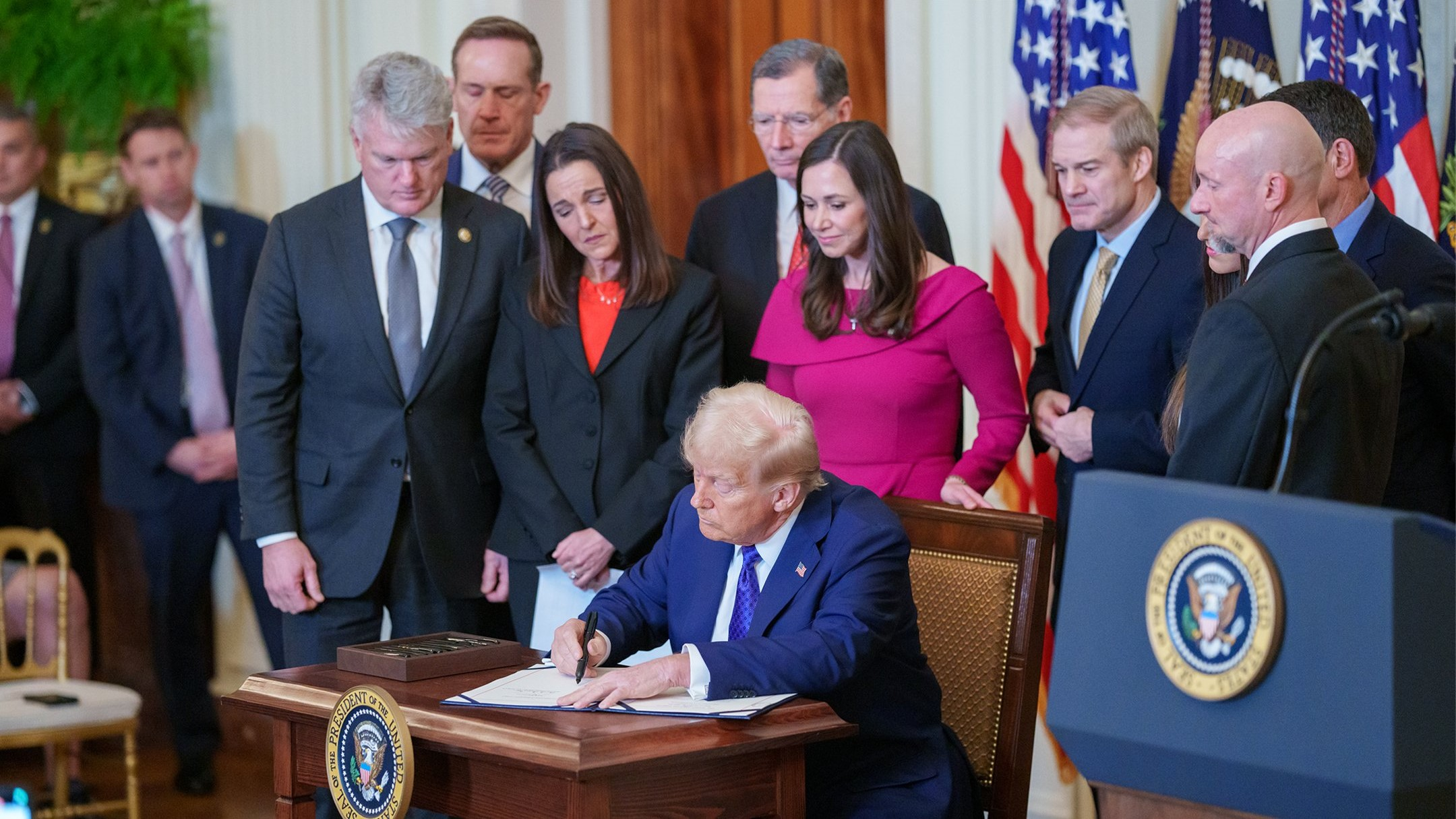
President Trump signs the Laken Riley Act into law.

On January 29, 2025, Trump signed the Laken Riley Act into law, the first legislation of Trump's second term. The law is named after Laken Riley, a nursing student who was murdered by an illegal immigrant in 2024. It requires the Immigration and Customs Enforcement (ICE) to detain illegal aliens accused or charged with theft-related crimes, and those accused of assaulting a police officer. It also allows states to sue the Department of Homeland Security for harm caused by illegals to citizens and for failure to enforce immigration laws. After signing the Laken Riley Act into law, Trump signed a presidential memorandum to order the Pentagon and Department of Homeland Security to begin the expansion of the migrant operations center in the Guantanamo Bay naval base, separate from the Guantanamo Bay Detention Camp military prison, to house up to 30,000 "high priority" illegal migrant detainees. The operations center was previously used to temporarily house migrants during prior presidencies.

In the days following the announcement, more than 1000 troops were deployed to Guantanamo to begin the expansion. Between 178 and 256 illegal migrants, many being deported back to their countries, had passed through the base and only 20 remained on March 6, 2025. By early March 2025, the Trump administration was rethinking the expansion at Guantanamo as major legal, logistical and financial hurdles had arisen. The space for 30,000 illegal migrants was still under construction and tents built for detainees did not meet ICE standards for detention. As the mission at Guantanamo was changing, the Pentagon was reportedly considering bringing home some of the over 1,000 troops that were sent for deployment home. On February 26, 2025, Department of Homeland Security secretary, Kristi Noem, announced that more than 20,000 illegal migrants were arrested in February and ICE arrests have skyrocketed 627% compared to the Biden Era arrests and that border crossings had declined by 90%.

==== Legal immigration ====
A Trump Gold Card will be a type of residency permit for the United States that allows investors a path to residency and citizenship if they commit at least $5 million to projects in the US. A key difference from the EB5 program, the United States' current path for investors to gain residency that the Gold Card intends to replace, is that Gold Card holders are not liable for US federal income tax on income earned outside the US. There are constitutional questions about executive authority for this kind of change to immigration and tax law without express Congressional approval. It is unclear what would happen to the US federal taxability of a Gold Card holder's non-US income if the holder becomes a US citizen.

=== Mass deportation of immigrants – Statistics ===
Arrests (Note: Arrests for the day total are arrests for the day prior, as ICE shifted on January 29th to announcing the total of the previous day to the total for the day of, as reflected in the change in caption on the bottom of each X post.)
Day	Arrests (% change from prior Day)
January 23	538
January 24	593(+9.27% ▲)
January 25	286(-51.8% ▼)
January 26	956(+334% ▲)
January 27	1,179(+23.3% ▲)
January 28	969(-17.8% ▼)
January 29	1,016(+15.6% ▲)
January 30	962(-5.3% ▼)
January 31	913(-5.1% ▼)
February 1	864(-5.4% ▼)
Total as of February 1	8,276(+)

Deportations
Month	Deportations (% change from previous month)
February 22, 2025	37,660
March 22	TBD(+)
April 22	TBD(+)
May 22	TBD(+)

=== Economic policy ===
Inflation remained a persistent topic during Trump's 2024 campaign and dominant issue of the subsequent election. After taking office on January 20, 2025, Trump inherited a resilient economy from the Biden administration, with inflation rates having declined from its 40-year highs, but remaining a heavy burden on Americans and above the Federal Reserve's 2% rate. The unemployment rate was 4.4%, the inflation rate ranged from 2.2% to 2.4%, and the national debt was approximately $36.2 trillion. During Trump's first term, the US faced increases in national debt; as did with previous presidencies, tariffs on US trading partners, and economic downturn resulting from the COVID-19 pandemic. Since becoming president, Trump has imposed tariffs on China and initially promised tariffs on Canada and Mexico, before rescheduling the tariff dates. During a Fox News interview with Maria Bartiromo on March 9, 2025, Trump did not rule out the possibility that the US economy would enter a recession. He said his economic policy would cause short-term turbulence but would be economically beneficial in the long term.

Treasury Secretary Scott Bessent said on March 16, 2025, that there are "no guarantees" that US economy will not enter a recession.

==== Tariffs ====
On February 1, 2025, Trump signed three executive orders imposing a 25 percent tariff on all goods from Mexico and Canada and a 10 percent tariff on China, originally due to take effect on February 4. A lower 10 percent tariff was announced for all energy exports from Canada, including electricity, natural gas, and oil. Trump's trade advisor, Peter Navarro, stated that the lower rate for energy was intended to "minimize any disruptive effects". In response, representatives from Mexico and Canada announced intentions to impose retaliatory tariffs on the United States, which if implemented could lead to an increase in tariff rates in accordance with a clause reportedly included in the orders signed by Trump. On February 3, Trump announced that the tariffs on both Mexico and Canada would be paused for one month after the countries agreed to take further steps to prevent the trafficking of drugs into the United States. On March 3, Trump announced he would impose the tariffs on Canada, China, and Mexico. The tariffs went into effect on March 4 triggering a trade war with Canada, China, and Mexico. On April 2, a day Trump nicknamed "Liberation Day", Trump announced a baseline 10% universal import tariff on all imported goods as well as even higher rates for 57 trading partners. These tariffs and retaliatory tariffs from other nations resulted in an immediate U.S. stock market crash and resulted in a bear market.

=== Diversity, equity, and inclusion ===
Trump signed numerous executive orders to roll back diversity, equity, and inclusion (DEI) policies. On his first day in office, he signed an executive order titled "Defending Women from Gender Ideology Extremism and Restoring Biological Truth to the Federal Government," which required federal departments to recognize gender as a male–female binary determined by sex assigned at conception and ceased all funding for gender-affirming care. Trump also signed an order which ordered federal agencies to fire all workers involved in diversity, equity, and inclusion programs.

Trump signed another executive order partially revoking Equal Employment Opportunity and banning government contracts from being given to private organizations which enforce DEI frameworks. On February 5, Trump signed an order intending to bar transgender athletes from competing in girls' and women's sports.

At a press conference held in January 2025, the day after a mid-air collision between an airplane and helicopter that killed 67 people, the worst aviation accident in the U.S. since 2001, Trump read from a January 2024 New York Post article that said "the FAA is actively recruiting workers who suffer severe intellectual disabilities, psychiatric problems and other mental and physical conditions under a diversity and inclusion hiring initiative spelled out on the agency's website."

== Foreign policy ==
Pursuant to the Protecting Americans from Foreign Adversary Controlled Applications Act, the social media app TikTok was de jure banned in the United States on January 19, one day before Trump took office (although Biden did not enforce the ban). Critics had argued that the app, owned by the Chinese company ByteDance, was a national security threat. On his first day in office, Trump signed an executive order pausing the ban for 75 days.

Trump also signed orders reinstating Cuba's designation as a state sponsor of terror, reversing sanctions on Israeli settlers, and withdrawing from the Paris Climate Agreement and the World Health Organization. On January 24, 2025, President Trump reinstated the Mexico City policy.

On April 30, 2025, Treasury Secretary Scott Bessent, and Ukraine's First Deputy Prime Minister Yulia Svyrydenko, signed a deal on the joint exploitation of Ukraine's rare earth minerals, which establishes a reconstruction investment fund for Ukraine's economic recovery.

== Government organization ==
Trump signs an executive order in the Oval Office with de facto DOGE leader Elon Musk on February 11, 2025.

On his first day in office, Trump signed an executive order establishing the Department of Government Efficiency (DOGE), a temporary organization headed by Elon Musk which aimed to reduce wasteful and fraudulent federal spending, and eliminate excessive regulations. He also signed an order to freeze new regulations and hiring for federal workers.

On January 23, 2025, Trump signed an executive order to declassify files concerning the assassination of John F. Kennedy, his brother Robert F. Kennedy and Martin Luther King Jr.

On January 28, the Office of Personnel Management offered a "deferred resignation" scheme to federal government employees to announce their resignation by February 6, while stating that employees who resigned would still receive salary and benefits until September 30, 2025.

The Trump administration, led by DOGE, targeted numerous federal agencies for weakening or outright abolishment. This included USAID, the Department of Education, and the Consumer Financial Protection Bureau. However, with USAID, the administration moved from a freeze to keeping 17% of starting programs, with these programs scheduled to be moved to the State Department and former USAID employees expected to go through a new hiring process.

On January 27, 2025, the Trump administration's Office of Management and Budget (OMB) released memo M-25-13, which ordered the federal government to take action the next day to temporarily freeze all federal funding while programs were being reviewed for compliance with Trump's executive orders. The memo sparked considerable uncertainty among government employees, lawmakers and nonprofit organizations, with Medicaid portals, FAFSA, and other programs being shut down across the country. After several organizations sued, the OMB memo was temporarily blocked by United States District Judge Loren AliKhan, with the memo being withdrawn on the 29th.

In his first 100 days, Trump has been noted for making sweeping assertions of executive authority, and challenging several Congressional laws and parts of the Constitution restraining presidential power.

=== Pardons ===
Trump issued a proclamation that granted clemency to about 1,500 people convicted of offenses related to the January 6 United States Capitol attack that occurred near the end of his first presidential term. He also commuted the sentences of many members of the Proud Boys and Oath Keepers including Enrique Tarrio and Stewart Rhodes.

Trump's grant of clemency was described by counterterrorism researchers as encouraging future political violence. Employees in the Justice Department and legal scholars called the pardons an unprecedented and dangerous use of the pardon and created a mockery of federal law enforcement, their work, and the US justice system.

Many of the pardoned rioters had prior convictions for rape, child sexual exploitation, domestic violence, manslaughter, drug trafficking, and other crimes.

Additionally, on January 21, 2025, Trump granted Ross Ulbricht, who was convicted of running a darknet market known as Silk Road, facilitating trade in narcotics, a full and unconditional pardon. This fulfilled a campaign promise Trump made during his speech at the Libertarian National Convention.

On January 23, 2025, Trump granted pardons to 23 anti-abortion protesters. Among the 23 pardoned were Lauren Handy and nine of her co-defendants, who were involved in the October 2020 blockade of a Washington, D.C., abortion clinic, and later convicted in violation of the Freedom of Access to Clinic Entrances Act.

=== Speech to a joint session of Congress ===
The 47th President of the United States, Donald Trump, gave his fifth public address before a joint session of the United States Congress on March 4, 2025.

During the joint session, Trump addressed topics such as cutting government deficits, economy, inflation, and more. Trump reiterated most of his campaign promises within his speech.

Trump gave the longest lasting speech in 61 years, lasting 1 hour and 49 minutes.

== Reactions ==
=== Polling ===
On January 21, a Reuters/Ipsos poll found that 47 percent of adult Americans approve of Trump's performance as president, while 41 percent disapprove. The poll also found that his pardons of people convicted of offenses related to the January 6 United States Capitol attack were unpopular. CNN analyst Harry Enten interpreted the poll's findings as "a sign that the American people, at least initially, like what they are seeing." On January 28, Reuters/Ipsos reported that Trump's approval rating decreased to 45 percent, with an increase to disapproval to 46 percent. On January 29, Gallup polling found that Trump's 47 percent inaugural approval rating was historically low and similar to his 45 percent inaugural approval rating in his first term. He remained the only elected president with sub-50 percent inaugural approval ratings, and his latest 48 percent disapproval ratings were three percentage points higher than in 2017, marking a new high for inaugural disapproval ratings.

A February 9, 2025 poll by CBS found that a majority of the 2,175 U.S. adults interviewed from February 5–7 found Trump "tough", "energetic", "focused" and "effective", and as "doing what he'd promised during his campaign" whether they approved of it or not, with many saying "he's doing more than they expected". It found that a majority both expressed support for his immigration policies but also that they also thought he wasn't doing enough to lower prices. On February 20, 2025, Politico reported on two new polls from CNN/SSRS and The Washington Post/Ipsos that found Trump's support slipping, with a majority saying that he had overstepped his presidential authority and hadn't done enough to address high prices. The Post also found 58% disapproved of his wide layoffs of federal employees and only 34% approved of Elon Musk's role in government.

==== By the conclusion of 100 days ====
By the end of his first 100 days, multiple polls largely showed Trump with a net negative and falling approval rating on every polled issue and among almost all demographics, especially independents. Time stated the speed of Trump's polling drop off was the sharpest among all 21st century presidents. A Fox News poll showed Trump with a total 44% job approval rating, lower than his 45% approval rating during his first term and with negative approval on every polled issue except for border security at 55% approval, followed by immigration at 47% and deportations at 45%, with his two lowest being tariffs and inflation both at 33%. A CNN/SSRS poll found that his approval rating at the end of 100 days was 41%, the lowest of any president in at least seven decades and lower than his first term's approval rating at this point. It found his polling on every issue was net negative except for his handling of matters relating to gender identity and trans people which was at 51% approval. Several other polled issues showed sharp declines since his election among all demographics, especially on the economy. Civiqs found him with a net negative approval rating in every swing state. Marist found his first 100-day approval rating at 42%, with a plurality giving him an "F" rating. Economist/YouGov found Trump's approval rating at 41%, which USA Today noted matched with the RealClearPolitics poll average turning negative for the first time around March 13, later dropping to -4.1 as of April 22. A Leadership Now Project/Harris poll showed a majority (84%) of senior business leaders of diverse political leanings were concerned about the impact of the Trump administration's policies on their businesses in particular and on the strength of the American economy in general.

In response to his negative approval ratings, Trump criticized multiple news organizations, calling them "criminals", "sick", "fake news", and that they should be investigated for election fraud and suffered from Trump derangement syndrome. He specifically targeted polling from The New York Times, The Washington Post, ABC News and Fox News.

=== Protests ===
Initial protests of the second Trump presidency began with the People's March, a protest which took place in Washington D.C. and various locations around the country two days before Trump took office, which went on various political issues. The protests were largely considered to be less significant and attracted smaller crowds than the 2017 Women's March and others during Trump's first presidency. The Day Without Immigrants took place in February 2025, which protested against Trump's immigration policies, similar to the Day Without Immigrants (2017) protests.

==== U.S. Department of Agriculture (USDA) Inspector general continues working in protest ====
On January 29, 2025, security guards escorted USDA Inspector General Phyllis K. Fong, out of her office, following her dismissal by newly installed President Trump. The previous Friday, Fong and Inspectors General from 16 other agencies received an email from the White House informing them of their immediate terminations. Despite the emailed notice of termination, she continued working in protest of what Fong, Democratic leaders, and several journalists stated was the illegal firing of inspectors general across 17 different agencies. The New York Times summarizes,

"The firings defied a law that requires presidents to give Congress 30 days’ advance notice before removing any inspector general, along with reasons for the firing. Just two years ago, Congress strengthened that provision by requiring the notice to include a “substantive rationale, including detailed and case-specific reasons” for the removal."

Media and critics called the sudden termination the “late-night purge,” questioning the intentions and legality of the mass firings of inspectors general often referred to as "independent watchdogs". Fong worked at USDA for 22 years. At the time of her dismissal her office monitored the rising avian influenza outbreaks. She also oversaw investigations into food safety, animal welfare violations, and financial audits within the department.

== See also ==
- Science policy of the second Trump administration
- Opinion polling on the second Trump presidency
- Political positions of Donald Trump
- Second presidential transition of Donald Trump – Transfer of presidential power from Joe Biden to Donald Trump
