= Reorganization plan =

Reorganization plan may refer to:

- In the United States, a plan enacted under presidential reorganization authority
  - Reorganization Plans No. 1, 2, and 3 under the Reorganization Act of 1939
  - Reorganization Plan No. 3 of 1970
- Land-use planning
