= Administrative Science =

Administrative Science may refer to:

- The study of public administration, governance, or management
  - Public administration theory
- Administrative Science Quarterly, an academic journal established in 1956
- Journal of Administrative Sciences, an academic journal of Çanakkale Onsekiz Mart University

== See also ==
- Business administration, the administration of a commercial enterprise
