= Hoover Commission =

US advisory commission on executive reform

- Commission on Organization of the Executive Branch of the Government
- Successor: Second Hoover Commission
- Established: July 7, 1947; 79 years ago
- Dissolved: June 12, 1949; 77 years ago
- Products: 273 recommendations; in 19 separate reports.
- Chairman: Herbert Hoover (former U.S. president)

The Hoover Commission, officially named the Commission on Organization of the Executive Branch of the Government, was a body appointed by President Harry S Truman on July 7, 1947 to recommend administrative changes in the federal government of the United States. It took its nickname from former President Herbert Hoover, who was appointed by Truman to chair it.

Truman used the Reorganization Act of 1949 to implement the recommendations of the Hoover Commission. Reorganization plans issued under the act could be nullified by a concurrent resolution enacted by both chambers of Congress within 60 days of the date of the order. While most of the commission's program was ultimately implemented, eleven of the 41 reorganization plans issued by Truman to carry out the reorganization were nullified by Congress.

== History and results ==
In early 1949, the Commission forwarded its findings and a total of 273 recommendations to Congress in a series of nineteen separate reports. The commission was officially terminated on June 12, 1949.

The commission issued recommendations for eliminating waste, fraud and inefficiency, consolidating agencies, and strengthening White House control of policy.

With the impetus of the Hoover Commission, the Reorganization Act of 1949, (Public Law 109, 81st Cong., 1st sess.) was approved by Congress on June 20, 1949. President Truman made a special message to Congress upon signing the act, with eight reorganization plans submitted in 1949, 27 in 1950, and one each in 1951 and 1952.

Much implementation continued into the Eisenhower administration, with ten reorganization plans in 1953, two in 1954, and one each in 1957 and 1958, although not all were related to the 1949 Act. A later study in 1955 concluded that 116 of the recommendations were fully implemented and that another 80 were mostly or partly implemented. In 1953, Eisenhower created the Department of Health, Education and Welfare under the orders of his Reorganization Plan No. 1.

The commission's recommended reforms of veterans affairs were not implemented, due to significant lobbying against it by the American Legion, an influential veterans lobby group.

== Second Hoover Commission ==
External audio
- National Press Club Luncheon Speakers, Herbert Hoover, March 10, 1954, 37:23, Hoover speaks starting at 7:25 about the second reorganization commission, Library of Congress

A Second Hoover Commission was created by Congress in 1953 during the administration of President Dwight D. Eisenhower. It also was headed by Hoover (who was then almost 80 years old). The second commission sent its final report to Congress in June 1955.

== See also ==
- Presidential reorganization authority
- Public administration
- Presidential commission (United States)
- James Farley
- Committee on Department Methods (1905)
- Commission on Economy and Efficiency (1910–1913)
- Brownlow Committee (1937)
- Grace Commission (1982–1984)
- National Partnership for Reinventing Government (1993–1998)
- Project on National Security Reform (2006–2012)
- Little Hoover Commission (California)
