= Commission on Economy and Efficiency =

The Commission on Economy and Efficiency was a presidential commission appointed by President William Howard Taft between 1910 and 1913 to look at and propose reforms for the United States federal government, particularly the presidential budget. It is also known in government reorganization and reform scholarship as the Taft Commission, however, this is a bit of a misnomer as the Taft Commission originally referred to the Philippine Commission of which Taft was the chairman. The Commission on Economy and Efficiency is most notable for proposing the first budget for the federal government but also is notable for creating the procedure for the President to establish a commission to study administrative reform.

== Founding and purpose ==
The commission, like the Keep Commission, was established to study and propose more efficient methods of organization and reform. Its primary purpose was the study of a budget for the national government but its other purposes included looking at department or agency jurisdiction, personnel practices, accounting and finance procedures, and business practices.

Taft learned from Roosevelt's efforts with the Keep Commission, which had its reforms largely ignored by Congress, to involve Congress up front to have its reforms embraced. He therefore received approval from Congress prior to forming the commission and received a series of appropriations to fund the commission's work.

The commission was headed by legendary member of the New York Bureau of Municipal Research, Frederick Cleveland, who was already famous by this time for creating one of the first municipal budgets for New York City. New York City was the largest government in the United States by expenditures at the time. The other members of the commission were William Willoughby, Judge Walter Warwick, Frank Goodnow, and Harvey Chase. The Congressional legislation also provided for a Board of Referees and a Board of Experts.

== National budget ==
Since the end of the 19th century, the federal government was running deficits because of a weak tax base and pent up demand for services. Therefore, the primary purpose of the commission was to develop a better method for providing for a more rationalized budget system. The members of the commission brought their work from the New York Bureau of Municipal Research and began applying it to the national government. From their early studies of the federal government and previous experience of creating the New York budget, the commission published The Need for a National Budget, a report calling for the federal government to create a national budget.

The commission was not content to create a document which just explained the idea of the federal executive budget. Willoughby and Taft went against the expressed opinion of Congress that the president had the right to deliver any information to Congress in any way that the president chose. President Taft submitted to Congress the first consolidated federal budget in the form that the commission had created in 1913. This would be President Taft's last official act of state. While Congress generally ignored Taft's budget, the budget idea was firmly established.

== Legacy of the commission ==
Like most major governmental reforms, the main purposes and recommendation were contested and not immediately acted upon. Besides some reforms that could be acted upon administratively, the commission has had two major, lasting legacies.

The first legacy of the commission was to establish the legitimate participation of the president in administrative reorganization. Prior to this time, the only presidential commission to look at issues of administrative efficiency and effectiveness for the government in its entirety was the Keep Commission, the results of which were ignored by Congress. It should be further recognized that Congress reacted to the Keep Commission by cutting off the funding for any such presidentially created commission in the future. By getting approval from Congress first, the President established a process for participating and guiding administrative reorganization efforts.

The second major legacy is the national budget, which was established by the Budget and Accounting Act of 1921. The federal executive budget, then as now, remains in tension with Congress's appropriation and budgeting procedures. For many years after the Budget and Accounting Act, the executive grew in its power to shape and control the budget of the United States. It was only after the passage of the Congressional Budget and Impoundment Control Act of 1974 that Congress began wresting back some control over the budgetary process. The budgetary process, first envisioned by the Commission on Economy and Efficiency, is constrained by the Constitution so that only the House of Representatives can tax the people. The idea of federal budgeting is important but complex and still contested.

== See also ==
- Presidential commission (United States)
- Committee on Department Methods (1905)
- Brownlow Committee (1937)
- Hoover Commission – two commissions in 1947–1949 and 1953–1955
- Public administration
