= Morley Winograd =

American author and speaker

- Born: United States
- Education: University of Michigan
- Employer(s): University of Southern California; Principal, Mike & Morley

Morley Winograd is an American author, speaker, and policy advisor. He is a Senior Fellow at the University of Southern California's Annenberg Center on Communication Leadership & Policy.

== Career ==
Winograd served as Chairman of the Michigan Democratic Party from 1973 to 1979, president of the Association of State Democratic Chairs from 1979 to 1980, and chairman of the Commission on Presidential Nomination and Party Structure from 1973 to 1978.

Winograd began his career in 1979 in the telecommunications industry with the Michigan Bell company. He was the Sales Vice President for AT&T's Western Region Commercial Markets. Winograd is also responsible for creating the AT&T University of Sales Excellence Program.

In 1988, Winograd also chaired Al Gore's presidential primary campaign in Michigan. As a member of the Democratic Leadership Council, in 1991, Winograd served as Parliamentarian at the National Convention in Cleveland, Ohio.

In 1996, with Dudley Buffa, he helped co-found the Institute for the New California (INC), a think tank devoted to aligning that state's governing systems with requirements for the information age. Winograd is co-author with Buffa of Taking Control: Politics in the Information Age (published in 1996).

In December 1997, He was appointed Senior Policy Advisor to former Vice President Al Gore and Director of the National Partnership for Reinventing Government. Winograd left his post in January 2001 to return to Southern California.

He is currently a Senior Fellow at the University of Southern California's Annenberg Center on Communication Leadership & Policy.

Winograd is a published author, co-authoring Millennial Momentum: How a New Generation Is Remaking America (2011) and Millennial Makeover: MySpace, YouTube, and the Future of American Politics (2008), both published by Rutgers University Press.

== Education ==
Winograd graduated from the University of Michigan with a Bachelor's Degree in Business Administration in 1963.
