= POSDCORB =

Management and public administration acronym

POSDCORB is an acronym widely used in the field of management and public administration that reflects the classic view of organizational theory. It appeared most prominently in a 1937 paper by Luther Gulick (in a set edited by himself and Lyndall Urwick). However, he first presented the concept in 1935. Initially, POSDCORB was envisioned in an effort to develop public service professionals. In Gulick's own words, the elements are as follows: planning, organizing, staffing, directing, co-ordinating, reporting and budgeting.

== Coining of the acronym ==
In his piece "Notes on the Theory of Organization", a memo prepared while he was a member of the Brownlow Committee, Luther Gulick asks rhetorically "What is the work of the chief executive? What does he do?" POSDCORB is the answer, "designed to call attention to the various functional elements of the work of a chief executive because 'administration' and 'management' have lost all specific content."

According to Gulick, the elements are:

- Planning
- Organizing
- Staffing
- Directing
- Co-ordinating
- Reporting
- Budgeting

== Elaborations ==
Gulick's "Notes on the Theory of Organization" further defines the patterns of POSDCORB. That document explains how portions of an executive's workload may be delegated, and that some of the elements can be organized as subdivisions of the executive depending on the size and complexity of the enterprise.

Under organizing, Gulick emphasized the division and specialization of labor in a manner that would increase efficiency. Yet Gulick observed that there were limitations. Based on his practical experience, he carefully articulated the many factors.

Gulick described how the organization of workers could be done in four ways. According to him, these are related and may be multi-level. Specifically, they are:

- By the purpose the workers are serving, such as furnishing water, providing education, or controlling crime. Gulick lists these in his organizational tables as vertical organizations.
- By the process the workers are using, such as engineering, doctoring, lawyering, or statistics. Gulick lists these in his organizational tables as horizontal organizations.
- By the clientele or material: the persons or things being dealt with, such as immigrants, veterans, forests, mines, or parks in government; or such as a department store's furniture department, clothing department, hardware department, or shoe department in the private sector.
- By the place where the workers do their work.

Gulick stresses how these modes of organization often cross, forming interrelated structures. Organizations like schools may include workers and professionals not in the field of education such as nurses. How they are combined or carefully aggregated into a school — or a school system — is of concern. But the early work of Gulick was not limited to small organizations. He started off his professional career at New York City's Bureau of Municipal Research and advanced to President Franklin D. Roosevelt's Committee on Administrative Management.

Under coordination, Gulick notes that two methods can be used to achieve coordination of divided labor. The first is by organization, or placing workers under managers who coordinate their efforts. The second is by dominance of an idea, where a clear idea of what needs to be done is developed in each worker, and each worker fits their work to the needs of the whole. Gulick notes that these two ideas are not mutually exclusive, and that most enterprises function best when both are utilized.

Gulick notes that any manager will have a finite amount of time and energy, and discusses span of control under coordination. Drawing from the work of Henri Fayol, Gulick notes that the number of subordinates that can be handled under any single manager will depend on factors such as organizational stability and the specialization of the subordinates. Gulick stops short of giving a definite number of subordinates that any one manager can control, but authors such as Sir Ian Hamilton and Lyndall Urwick have settled on numbers between three and six. Span of control was later expanded upon and defended in depth by Lyndall Urwick in his 1956 piece "The Manager's Span of Control".

Under coordination, as well as organization, Gulick emphasizes the theory of unity of command: that each worker should only have one direct superior so as to avoid confusion and inefficiency.

Gulick discusses the concept of a holding company which may perform limited coordinating, planning, or budgeting functions. Subsidiary entities may carry out their work with autonomy, but as the holding company allows, based upon their authority and direction.

== Influence from French administration theory ==
Luther Gulick, one of the Brownlow Committee authors, states that his statement of work of a chief executive is adapted from the functional analysis elaborated by Henri Fayol in his "Industrial and General Administration". Indeed, Fayol's work includes fourteen principles and five elements of management that lay the foundations of Gulick's POSDCORB.

Fayol's fourteen principles of management are as follows:

- Division of work: The division of work principle declares that staffs function better when assigned tasks according to their specialties.
- Authority and responsibility: This principle proposes the requirement for managers or manager like authority in order to effectively direct subordinates to perform their jobs while still being held accountable for their conduct.
- Discipline: The discipline principle supports strict and clearly defined rules and regulations in the workplace to ensure professional employee behavior and order.
- Unity of command: The unity of command doctrine proclaims that employees should only receive command and report to one administrator or boss-like authority figure.
- Unity of direction: The unity of direction principle states that there should only be one plan, one objective and one director head for each specific plan.
- Subordination of individual interest to general interest: The subordination of individual interest to general interest principle declares that the interests and objectives of the organization overrides the interests of any employee, management staff, or any group.
- Remuneration of personnel: The remuneration of personnel principle deems that both staff and management salary should be fairly earned, justifiable and no party should be deceived.
- Centralization: The centralization principle advocates that managerial decision making should be centralized with orders being delivered from top tier management to the middle management, where the orders are arranged and then clarified for the line staff to execute.
- Scalar chain (line of authority with peer level communication): The scalar chain principle contends that communication within the organization should only be one uninterrupted vertical flow of communication and any other type of communication should only occur in times of emergencies and when approved by a manager.
- Order: The order principle can be interpreted in either of the two ways; some believe this principle refers to giving every material in the organization its right position while other believe it means delegating the right job to the right employee.
- Equity: The equity principle proclaims that managers should be fair and impartial to their staff but the relationship should still be in compliance with the principle of subordination of individual interest to general.
- Stability of tenure of personnel: The stability of tenure of personnel principle states that management should employ the right staff and properly train them in hopes of retaining their employment for a long time and benefiting the organization through experience and expertise.
- Initiative: The initiative principle refers to the management and their creativity and their ability to implement them within the organization to ensure growth and success in the organization.
- Esprit de corps: The esprit de corps principle believes that organizations should promote high morale and unity to retain the best employees for lengthy periods of time.

Fayol's influence is also visibly apparent in Gulick's five elements of management discussed as in his book, which are as follows:

- Planning – examining the future and drawing up plans of actions
- Organizing – building up the structure (labor and material) of the undertaking
- Command – maintaining activity among the personnel
- Co-ordination – unifying and harmonizing activities and efforts
- Control – seeing that everything occurs in conformity with policies and practices

== Role in management and public administration history ==
POSDCORB and its humble beginnings in the Brownlow Committee literature is still heavily referenced in today's public administration and politics. Many public administrators even believe the Brownlow documents initiated "the Reorganization Act of 1939, a train of measures that the act set in motion can reasonably be attributed to it".

POSDCORB management theories that are also responsible for the administrative reorganization that occurred around 1937, which utilizes Gulick's organizing and coordinating steps in the POSDCORB administrative process providing for more concise departments and even room for new agencies within the government making for a more efficient government.

POSDCORB generally fits into the classical management movement, being classified as an element of social scientific management, which was popular in the late 19th and early 20th century. Gulick's POSDCORB patterns were instrumental in highlighting the theory of span of control, or limits on the number of people one manager could supervise, as well as unity of command to the fields of management and public administration.

According to notable public administration scholars such as Nicholas Henry, POSDCORB, the principles it represents, and subsequent expansions upon the POSDCORB concept form the height of public administration in an era when it was seen as just another aspect of the field of management as a whole.

Gulick's work has been heavily cited and expanded upon by scholars and practitioners in the fields of management and public administration since the publication of Papers on the Science of Administration in 1937.

In his 1987 piece "Deja Vu: French Antecedents of American Public Administration", French public administrator, Daniel Martin notes that virtually all of the principles in American public administration up to 1937 and the coining of the POSDCORB acronym, including the POSDCORB principles, were present in the French literature on the subject by 1859, but that this literature had largely been forgotten by the theorists of that era, thus the "re-invention" of these principles in the later French and American literature.

Essentially, "The highest goals of the American Administrative State are the same today as they were in 1937 and in 1787: Public administration is first and foremost concerned with upholding the democratic values embedded within our constitutional heritage."

== Criticisms ==
As early as 1938, literature began appearing in the field of public administration challenging the validity of POSDCORB and the concept that there could even be a rigid set of principles in administration. In 1946 and 1947, prominent public administration scholars such as Robert Dahl, Dwight Waldo, and Herbert A. Simon released articles and books criticising POSDCORB and the principles notion. Simon's article "Proverbs of Administration" challenges the POSDCORB principles by stating "For almost every principle one can find an equally plausible and acceptable contradictory principle." Among other criticisms, Simon states that the POSDCORB principles are an oversimplification of administration. Simon's criticisms largely center around span of control and unity of command, stating that sometimes it is necessary for a subordinate to receive guidance or directives from more than one source, as well as Gulick's division of labor concepts. Other criticisms of Simon involved that there was a lack of evidence for the POSDCORB. Yet others argue that organizations are full of variety and are challenging to control.

== Strength of POSDCORB ==
POSDCORB generally fits into the classical management movement, being classified as an element of scientific management. Gulick's POSDCORB principles were instrumental in highlighting the theory of span of control, or limits on the number of people one manager could supervise, as well as the unity of command to the fields of management and public administration. Besides, POSDCORB's strength also calls the 14 principles of management.

== Support ==
In his 2016 piece "Instantiations of POSDCORB", practitioner Paul Chalekian suggested empirical evidence for POSDCORB involving the adoption of institutions and element support.
