= Grace Commission =

Investigation to eliminate inefficiency in the United States federal government

The Private Sector Survey on Cost Control (PSSCC), commonly referred to as the Grace Commission, was an investigation requested by United States President Ronald Reagan, authorized in Executive Order 12369 on June 30, 1982. In doing so, President Reagan used the now famous phrase, "Drain the swamp". The survey's focus was on eliminating waste and inefficiency in the United States federal government. Businessman J. Peter Grace chaired the commission. Reagan asked the members of that commission to "Be bold. We want your team to work like tireless bloodhounds. Don't leave any stone unturned in your search to root out inefficiency."

== Report ==
The Grace Commission report was presented to Congress in January 1984. The report claimed that if its recommendations were followed, $424 billion could be saved in three years, rising to $1.9 trillion per year by the year 2000. It estimated that the national debt, without these reforms, would rise to $13 trillion by the year 2000, while with the reforms they projected it would rise to only $2.5 trillion. The US national debt reached $5.6 trillion in the year 2000 and reached 13 trillion in 2010 after the Great Recession.

The report's recommendations that intruded into policy were ignored by Congress, but many other efficiency recommendations were considered and some were implemented. The report said that one-third of all income taxes are consumed by waste and inefficiency in the federal government, and another one-third escapes collection owing to the underground economy. The report to the president stated:

With two thirds of everyone's personal income taxes wasted or not collected, 100 percent of what is collected is absorbed solely by interest on the federal debt and by federal government contributions to transfer payments. In other words, all individual income tax revenues are gone before one nickel is spent on the services that taxpayers expect from their government.

== Reactions ==
Political science professor Charles T. Goodsell read through 45 of the 47 volumes of the commission's findings, and noted that the methodology appeared to give much power to the corporate experts whom the commission employed in interviewing federal employees; he also noted the potential for conflicts of interest.

The Congressional Budget Office and General Accounting Office filed a joint report in 1984 finding that deficit reduction from the 90% of the commission's recommendations they analyzed would only amount to $98 billion. It also critiqued several recommendations as vague or lacking in data, and found disparities between agencies on the relevance of certain performance metrics.

== See also ==
- National debt
- Federal Reserve System
- Public administration
- Public administration theory

=== Other similar commissions ===
- Brownlow Committee (1937)
- Hoover Commission (two commissions, in 1947–1949 and 1953–1955)
- National Partnership for Reinventing Government (1993–1998)
- Department of Government Efficiency (2025–present)

== Literature ==
- Goodsell, Charles (May–June 1984). "The Grace Commission: Seeking Efficiency for the Whole People?". Public Administration Review. 44 (3): 196–204. doi:10.2307/975482. JSTOR 975482.
- Hildreth, W. Bartley; Hildreth, Rodger (Spring 1989). "The Business of Public Management". Public Productivity Review. 12 (3): 303–321. doi:10.2307/3380120. JSTOR 3380120.
