= National Partnership for Reinventing Government =

Interagency task force under Bill Clinton

The National Partnership for Reinventing Government (NPR) was a U.S. government reform initiative launched in 1993 by Vice President Al Gore. Its goal was to make the federal government "work better, cost less, and get results Americans care about". The initiative aimed to streamline processes, cut bureaucracy (with a focus on overhead costs beyond issues addressable by statute), and implement innovative solutions. NPR was active until 1998.

During its five years, it catalyzed significant changes in the way the federal government operates, including the elimination of over 100 programs, the elimination of over 250,000 federal jobs, the consolidation of over 800 agencies, and the transfer of institutional knowledge to contractors. NPR introduced the use of performance measurements and customer satisfaction surveys, and encouraged the use of technology including the Internet. NPR is recognized as a success and had a lasting impact according to government officials who worked on or were influenced by it under the Bill Clinton and George W. Bush administrations.

== History ==
=== Background ===
In March 1993, President Bill Clinton stated that he planned to "reinvent government", declaring that "Our goal is to make the entire federal government less expensive and more efficient, and to change the culture of our national bureaucracy away from complacency and entitlement toward initiative and empowerment." Clinton assigned the project to Gore with a six-month deadline to develop the plan. The National Performance Review (NPR) released its first report in September 1993, listing 384 recommendations. The report was the product of months of consultation with government departments and the White House, consolidating 2,000 pages of proposals.

NPR promised to save the federal government about $108 billion: $40.4 billion from a "smaller bureaucracy", $36.4 billion from program changes, and $22.5 billion from streamlining contracting processes. The recommendations variously required legislative action, presidential action, internal bureaucratic reform, or combinations of them. The major targeted bureaucracies were the Departments of Agriculture, Interior, Health and Human Services (HHS), Labor, and Housing and Urban Development (HUD), and the Agency for International Development (AID). The first annual status report claimed that, pending Congressional action, likely savings would amount to about $12.2 billion in 1994.

In 1993, Congress rejected many NPR proposed departmental cuts, demonstrating that NPR could not achieve its goals without congressional support. Kettl pointed out that "although [it] had a strategy leading to the release of its report on September 7, 1993, it had no strategy for September 8 and afterward." Procurement reform bills were enacted, including the Federal Acquisition Streamlining Act of 1994, the Federal Acquisition Reform Act of 1995, and the Clinger-Cohen Act in 1996.

In a September 1996 pamphlet, Gore wrote that the federal government had reduced its workforce by nearly 24,000 as of January 1996, and that thirteen of the fourteen cabinet departments had reduced their workforce. In addition, thousands of "obsolete" field offices were closed.

Toward the end of Clinton's first term, NPR's task evolved from "review and recommend" to "support agencies in their reinventing goals", reflected in the change of the senior advisor from Elaine Kamarck to Morley Winograd. Around this time the name change occurred to reflect more engagement with relevant public institutions such as student loans, the IRS, and emergency preparedness.

=== Creation ===
The partnership was announced during Clinton's address on March 3, 1993, to a joint session of the United States Congress. This initiative was a reboot of the National Performance Review, and consisted of a six-month efficiency review spearheaded by U.S. Vice President Al Gore. After preparing the report, Gore led an effort that evolved into the longest-running and arguably most successful reform effort in U.S. history.

In his address Clinton provided this rationale for the NPR: "The conditions which brought us as a nation to this point are well known. Two decades of low productivity growth and stagnant wages, persistent unemployment and underemployment, years of huge government and declining investment in our future, exploding health care costs, and lack of coverage for millions of Americans, legions of poor children, education and job training opportunities inadequate to the demands of this tough global economy."

The objectives of the NPR were to "create a clear sense of mission; delegate authority and responsibility; replace regulations with incentives; develop budget-based outcomes; and measure [our] success by customer satisfaction."

Clinton's proposal consisted of four components, detailing the shift from:

- consumption to investment in both the public and private sectors,
- changing the rhetoric of public decision making so that it honors work and families,
- substantially reducing federal debt, and
- administering government spending and cuts.

Gore presented the National Performance Review on September 7, 1993. Gore cited the long-term goal to "change the very culture of the federal government," and designated "optimism" and "effective communication" as the keys to success. The report noted that successful organizations—businesses, city and state governments, and organizations of the federal government—do four things well. These four things became the recipe for reinventing government: 1) Put customers first; 2) Cut red tape; 3) Empower employees to get results; 4) Cut back to basics.

=== Legacy ===
The Hammer Award recognizes government efficiency as a part of the program. It consists of a $6 hammer, a striped ribbon and an aluminum-framed note from Gore. The award parodies the Pentagon's bloated hardware costs, including the infamous $436 hammer, although the cost of the hammer was actually an artifact of government accounting rules and included not just the cost of the equipment but also a portion of the overhead cost of the entire project it was associated with.

== General trends in the federal government ==
=== Streamlining ===
Many attempts at reducing red tape involved streamlining grant processes. The U.S. Department of Commerce "streamlin[ed] the internal grants process" in order to reduce the amount of paperwork involved in applications for financial assistance. The Department of Transportation transitioned to electronic submission of grant forms. The Alamo Federal Executive Board Reinvention Lab in Texas works to "remove unnecessary regulations… so that intergovernmental employees may work together as partners" and eliminate problems together.

=== National service ===
In addition to its association with executive branch reform, the NPR is bound to the idea of national service. Clinton stated "National service is nothing less than the American way to change America. It is rooted in the concept of community: the simple idea that every one of us, no matter how many privileges with which we are born, can still be enriched by the contributions of the least of us." In 1993, the Corporation for National Service (CNS) was created to further "develop and expand the President's reinvention themes." Like NPR, the main goal of CNS was to yield fast results. Likewise, the CNS was dedicated to producing "well-informed decisions without delay, keep[ing] staffing lean and flexible, multiply[ing] resources, and delegat[ing] authority and responsibility in-house and in the field."

== Impact ==
=== Department of Housing and Urban Development ===
The original NPR made 10 recommendations directed at HUD. The report recommended that HUD eliminate their annual budget reviews and work with Congress to change rent rules that would increase incentives for people to leave public housing as soon as they find jobs.

The recommendations include.

- "Reinvent Public housing": Improve housing management, eliminate unnecessary procedures and help provide a broader range of choices for public housing tenants.
- "Improve management over multifamily assets and disposition": Spot HUD financial assets, improve public-private partnerships, resolve loan issues and improve FHA insurance programs.
- "Establish a New Housing Production Program": Improve availability for multifamily housing loans, create a partnership between FHA, non-profits and the government to help resurrect troubled neighborhoods.

=== Defense spending ===
According to military strategist Isaiah Wilson III, a fundamental step towards reinvention was skipped. For example, the Arms Export Control Act, which controls arms trading and related technologies, remained essentially untouched after phase 2 of the NPR.

The NPR did not significantly affect defense spending.

Concerning foreign military sales, NPR was unable to resolve whether the federal government's "customer" was nations purchasing arms and technologies or the American taxpayer.

=== Workforce ===
Downsizing was a common goal for every part of government including management. Supervisors abound at every level of government. The NPR sought to compel supervisors to become accountable for their domain.

Clinton constructed a proposal to decentralize the human resource function by eliminating the United States Office of Personnel Management (OPM). At the time applicants had apply for multiple civil service jobs rather than just jobs they wanted. Managers were given more responsibility and could influence employee careers.

The job cuts drew criticism. The dean of the School of Public Policy at the University of Maryland, Donald Kettl noted the problem of the shrinking government, stating "The reduction didn't happen in a way that matched workforce needs because they used a strategy for downsizing to hit a target". Kettl also claimed that downsizing public service was a higher priority than making the system work better. NPR sought to eliminate "inspectors general, controllers, procurement officers and personnel specialists".

Project Director and "Energizer in Chief" Bob Stone aimed for a no-layoff policy, but failed. Stone worked closely with OPM to gain support for a buyout program that offered payments up to 50,000 to persuade employees to leave. As a result, more than 25,000 employees left.

=== Government Printing Office ===
NPR examined government printing, namely the operation of the Government Printing Office (GPO). According to NPR recommendations, GPO had a monopoly on government printing and was responsible for great spending waste. The three specific recommendations were:

- Authorize the executive branch to eliminate the printing monopoly.
- Ensure public access to federal information.
- Develop integrated electronic access to government information and services.

=== Executive branch ===
Gore intended to reduce the number of workers in the executive branch. Many agencies saw the downsizing as detrimental because it left them "shorthanded in the delivery of programs and services." However, Gore expected that a smaller workforce would allow agencies to focus on customer service instead of managing unneeded workers. This emphasis on customer service coincided with Gore's determination to focus on what citizens want from government. The report suggests "redefin[ing] the role of the institutional presidency" by reducing the management role. This would involve "devolving management authority to the lowest level possible and shift[ing] accountability from the President to agency 'customers'." In this case, lowest level refers to interagency committees; however, management duties would be assigned to "the politically appointed leadership in the departments and agencies".

=== Savings Review and Subsidy List ===
In 1993, staff of the first NPR, including Deputy Director Robert Knisely and Steve Tidrick, compiled a list of federal subsidies valued at $700 billion. It was a "working document unvetted by the political process." Elimination of the subsidies would have balanced the United States federal budget by the year 2000.

The NPR acted upon only a fraction of the potential savings. Deputy Director John Kamensky commented: "What we found was politically too scary to do anything with." Nevertheless, the NPR reduced the federal workforce by 426,200 personnel between January 1993 and September 2000 and reduced federal spending by $136 billion.

In the end, the United States federal budget was balanced by 1998 and through the year 2001, due to a strong economy generating high tax revenues, tax increases that "fell almost exclusively on upper-income taxpayers," reduced federal spending, and increased capital gains tax revenue resulting from the dot-com boom.

== Similar commissions ==
While government reformation efforts often come relatively early in a president's term, it is rare for presidents to push for reform immediately on taking office. Government reform has been practiced for over a century, beginning in 1905 with Theodore Roosevelt's Keep Commission. The following are other examples of reformation commissions:

- Brownlow Committee, (1937)
- Hoover Commission, two commissions in 1947–1949 and 1953–1955.
- Grace Commission (1982–1984)
- Project on National Security Reform (2006–2012)
- Department of Government Efficiency (2025–2026)
