= First hundred days (United States) =

Political benchmark

The first hundred days is a term in United States politics that refers to the initial period of a president's first term in office, often used as a benchmark to evaluate the early accomplishments and direction of a new administration. The concept is most closely associated with Franklin D. Roosevelt, who, during the opening months of his presidency in 1933, undertook a flurry of legislative and executive actions to address the crisis of the Great Depression.

== Origin of the term ==
The phrase "first hundred days" was popularized by Roosevelt himself in a radio address on July 24, 1933. However, he originally referred to the special 100-day session of the 73rd United States Congress, which ran from March 9 to June 17, 1933, rather than to his own first 100 days in office. During this period, Roosevelt and Congress enacted an unprecedented array of legislation aimed at economic recovery and reform, laying the foundation for the New Deal.

== Historical context ==
Upon taking office, Roosevelt faced the immediate challenge of the Great Depression, with widespread unemployment, failing banks, and collapsing industry and agriculture. In response, he declared a "bank holiday" to halt the run on banks, took the United States off the gold standard, and signed numerous landmark bills into law, including the Emergency Banking Act, Agricultural Adjustment Act, Civilian Conservation Corps, Federal Emergency Relief Act, National Industrial Recovery Act, and the Tennessee Valley Authority Act.

== Significance and legacy ==
The extraordinary legislative productivity of Roosevelt's first hundred days set a new standard for subsequent presidents, who are now routinely evaluated on their ability to set the tone, enact major initiatives, and demonstrate leadership during this early period. While there is no constitutional or statutory basis for the first hundred days as a formal measure, it has become a symbolic milestone, amplified by media coverage and public expectations.

Presidents often enter office with high approval ratings and, if supported by congressional majorities, seek to capitalize on this momentum to advance their legislative agendas before political capital wanes. Notable examples include Lyndon B. Johnson’s push for the Great Society programs, Ronald Reagan’s tax cuts, and Barack Obama’s economic stimulus package.

== Criticism and limitations ==
Despite its prominence, many historians and political analysts caution that the first hundred days is an arbitrary benchmark. Some consequential policies and events occur later in a presidency, and early legislative success does not always predict long-term effectiveness or legacy.
