= Reorganization Plan No. 3 of 1970 =

US presidential directive

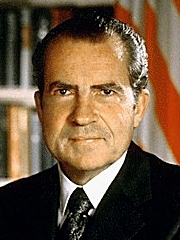
Richard Nixon, who proposed the EPA via Reorganization Plan No. 3

Reorganization Plan No. 3 was a United States presidential directive establishing the Environmental Protection Agency (EPA), effective December 2, 1970. The order, published in the Federal Register on October 6, 1970, consolidated components from different federal agencies to form the EPA, "a strong, independent agency" that would establish and enforce federal environmental protection laws.

== Background ==
According to EPA author Jack Lewis, the decade of the 1960s fostered a general consensus of the American public to increase protection and betterment of the environment. Rachel Carson published Silent Spring in 1962, which is widely credited with helping to launch the environmental movement in the United States. On January 28, 1969, eight days after Richard Nixon became the 37th President, a blowout on the ocean bottom near Union Oil's Platform "A" on the Dos Cuadras field leaked between 80,000 and 100,000 barrels (16,000 m^{3}) of oil into the water of the Santa Barbara Channel, near Santa Barbara, California. The oil spill polluted a 60-mile stretch of coastline, harming marine wildlife and damaging the local fishing economy. The event led to widespread criticism of both Union Oil and the offshore oil drilling industry. On April 22, 1970, the first Earth Day brought millions of Americans together to peacefully demonstrate in support of environmental reform.

In April 1969, President Richard Nixon addressed these environmental concerns by establishing the Environmental Quality Council in his cabinet, along with the complementary Citizens' Advisory Committee on Environmental Quality.

In December of the same year, Congress passed the National Environmental Policy Act (NEPA), a bill that was intended to "create and maintain conditions under which man and nature can exist in productive harmony" and to "assure for all Americans safe, healthful, productive, aesthetically and culturally pleasing surroundings." NEPA required any federal agency planning a project that would affect the environment to submit a report on the likely consequences of its plan. President Nixon signed the bill on New Year's Day 1970, declaring "that the 1970s absolutely must be the years when America pays its debt to the past by reclaiming the purity of its air, its waters, and our living environment."

== Reorganization plan and the formation of the EPA ==
=== Establishment ===
Reorganization Plan No. 3 was proposed by President Nixon in a message sent to Congress on July 9, 1970. The plan was authorized by a 1966 amendment to Title 5 of the United States Code (Government Organization and Employees). After conducting hearings during that summer, the House and Senate approved the proposal. Unlike other agencies such as Occupational Safety and Health Administration (also established in 1970), the EPA was not established by a single enabling act of Congress.

=== Components of the EPA ===
In his message to Congress President Nixon stated that the national government was "not structured to make a coordinated attack on the pollutants which debase the air we breathe, the water we drink, and the land that grows our food." According to Nixon, the assigned duties and responsibilities regarding pollution control for the environment were spread out among many discrete departments, creating a structure that often defied "effective and concerted action." To create more of an interrelated and effective system for dealing with environmental pollution, he proposed "pulling together into one agency a variety of research, monitoring, standard-setting and enforcement activities now scattered through several departments and agencies." Part of the intent of the reorganization was also to take away the job of pollution control from departments with economic promotional interests, as it was seen as a conflict of interest.

Under the terms of Reorganization Plan No. 3, the Environmental Protection Agency would be created to absorb the following agencies:

- From the Department of the Interior, EPA would absorb the entire Federal Water Quality Administration, as well as pesticide study functions located elsewhere in the department.
- From the Department of Health, Education, and Welfare Public Health Service, EPA would absorb the entire National Air Pollution Control Administration; the Environmental Control Administration's Bureau of Solid Waste Management, Bureau of Water Hygiene, and part of the Bureau of Radiological Health, and certain pesticides-related functions of the Food and Drug Administration.
- From the Department of Agriculture, the responsibilities of the Agricultural Research Service to register pesticides would be transferred.
- The new agency would also absorb the authority of the Council on Environmental Quality to perform studies on ecological systems and the duties of the Federal Radiation Council (which was completely absorbed into EPA) and the Atomic Energy Commission regarding radiation criteria and standards.

=== Role of the EPA ===
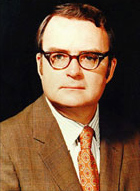
William Ruckelshaus, the first Administrator of the EPA

On December 16, 1970, the first Administrator of the EPA, William Ruckelshaus, declared that the agency had "a broad responsibility for research, standard-setting, monitoring and enforcement with regard to five environmental hazards; air and water pollution, solid waste disposal, radiation, and pesticides."

In Reorganization Plan No. 3, President Nixon outlined the following as the roles and functions of the EPA: establishing and enforcing environmental protection standards consistent with national environmental goals; conducting research on the adverse effects of pollution and on methods and equipment for controlling it, the gathering of information on pollution, and the use of this information in strengthening environmental protection programs and recommending policy changes; assisting others, through grants, technical assistance and other means in arresting pollution of the environment; and assisting the Council on Environmental Quality in developing and recommending to the President new policies for the protection of the environment.

== Legal challenge ==
The 1970 plan was originally approved under special Congressional procedures but its legality was called into question due to the Supreme Court's decision in Immigration and Naturalization Service v. Chadha, 462 U.S. 919 (1983). Congress responded by enacting the Reorganization Acts Amendment in Pub. L. 98–614, which was signed on November 8, 1984. The Amendment expanded the power of the President to communicate with Congress plans of reorganization of agencies within the executive branch.
