= Federal Security Agency =

United States government agency

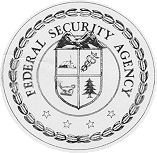

Agency overview
- Formed: July 1, 1939; 87 years ago
- Dissolved: April 11, 1953
- Superseding agency: United States Department of Health, Education, and Welfare
- Jurisdiction: Federal government of the United States

The Federal Security Agency (FSA) was an independent agency of the United States government established in 1939 pursuant to the Reorganization Act of 1939. For a time, the agency oversaw food and drug safety, education funding, administration of public health programs, and the Social Security old-age pension plan. It became the Department of Health, Education, and Welfare in 1953.

== Creation and early history ==
The Reorganization Act of 1939 authorized the president of the United States to devise a plan to reorganize the executive branch of government. Pursuant to the act, President Franklin D. Roosevelt issued "Reorganization Plan No. 1 of 1939" on April 25, 1939. The reorganization plan was designed to reduce the number of agencies reporting directly to the president, and to bring together in one agency all federal programs in the fields of health, education, and social security.

The Federal Security Agency (FSA) was established on July 1, 1939. The initial components of the FSA were:

- The U.S. Public Health Service (PHS). On July 16, 1798, President John Adams signed an act creating the Marine Hospital Service to furnish treatment to sick and disabled American merchant seamen. On April 29, 1878, the first Federal Quarantine Act enlarged the Service's responsibilities to include prevention of epidemics from abroad. On August 14, 1912, the name was changed to the Public Health Service.
- The Office of Education. Even though the first steps toward public education were taken in 1647 by the Massachusetts Bay Colony and land was set aside for public schools by the Congress of the Confederation in 1785, the idea of universal, free public schools did not become firmly established until the Civil War era. Even then, only half of the States had an efficient public school system. In 1867, Congress established the Department of Education to promote the cause of education and collect and disseminate facts and statistics about education. Until it was transferred to the FSA, the Office of Education and its predecessor organization had been part of the Department of the Interior.
- The Civilian Conservation Corps (CCC) was born during the Great Depression to provide employment for American youth and advance conservation of the Nation's natural resources. It operated from April 5, 1933, until June 30, 1942. During that time, the CCC provided work training to 3 million men and advanced conservation by more than 25 years. It was an independent agency until it came to FSA.
- The Social Security Board. The Nation's social security and public assistance programs also were born during the Depression with approval of the Social Security Act on August 14, 1935. The initial Act of 1935 established the Social Security Board to administer Titles I, II, III, IV, and X of the act. It remained an independent organization until its transfer to FSA. The Social Security Act Amendments of 1939 revised and expanded basic provisions of the program and eligibility requirements and extended protection to aged wives, dependent children and certain survivors of insured workers.
- The National Youth Administration. Established in 1935 to provide youth with work training, it later trained young people for jobs in war industries. It was supervised by the Office of the Administrator from the time FSA was created in 1939 until 1942, when it was transferred to the War Manpower Commission.
- Federal funding of the American Printing House for the Blind. Organized in 1855 and incorporated by the Kentucky Legislature in 1858, it was established to produce educational materials for the blind and since 1879 has received an allocation of federal funds to help support this activity. Federal responsibility regarding the Printing House was transferred to FSA from the Treasury Department on July 1, 1939.

Under a Reorganization Plan that became effective on June 30, 1940, the organization of the Federal Security Agency (FSA) was enlarged:

- The Food and Drug Administration (FDA) was transferred from the Department of Agriculture. As a result of pressure for the federal government to control adulterated and misbranded foods and drugs, the Pure Food and Drug Act was enacted on June 30, 1906. These responsibilities were entrusted to the Bureau of Chemistry in the Department of Agriculture in 1907 and were organized into a Food, Drug and Insecticide Administration in 1927, renamed the Food and Drug Administration (FDA) in 1931. Transferred to FSA in 1940, FDA also was responsible for administering the Tea Importation Act (1897), the Filled Milk Act (1923), the Caustic Poison Act (1927), and the Food, Drug, and Cosmetic Act (1938).
- Saint Elizabeth's Hospital and Freedmen's Hospital were transferred from the Department of the Interior to PHS. Saint Elizabeth's Hospital, created by Act of Congress in 1852 as the Government Hospital for the Insane, received its first patients on January 15, 1855. Founder of Saint Elizabeth's was Dorothea Dix, the most prominent humanitarian of the era. The name was changed by Act of Congress in 1916. Freedmen's Hospital was an outgrowth of the Bureau for the Relief of Freedmen and Refugees authorized by the Act of March 3, 1865. In 1871, the hospital was transferred to the Department of the Interior.
- Federal functions relating to Howard University and the Columbia Institution for the Deaf were transferred to FSA from the Department of the Interior. Howard University was established by an act of March 2, 1867, to provide higher education for Negroes. Education for the deaf was made available in the District of Columbia through the Columbia Institution for the Deaf established by the Act of February 16, 1857. The name was changed to Gallaudet College in 1954.

Secretly, the FSA was also a cover agency from 1942 to 1944 for the War Research Service, a secret program to develop chemical and biological weapons.

The Vocational Rehabilitation Act Amendments of 1943 expanded functions relating to vocational rehabilitation and assigned them to the Federal Security Administrator, who established the Office of Vocational Rehabilitation on September 4, 1943, to carry out these functions. Since the original Vocational Rehabilitation Act of 1920, certain vocational rehabilitation and vocational education activities had been a responsibility of the Office of Education, first when it was part of the Department of Interior, then after it became part of FSA in 1939.

== Later history ==
World War II had a broad impact on the social programs of FSA. Between 1941 and 1947, the Government recognized the need to maintain essential health and welfare services. The Federal Security Administrator also served as coordinator of the Office of Health, Welfare, and related Defense Activities, renamed the Office of Defense, Health, and Welfare Services in September 1941, which provided health care, education, and related services necessitated by the war effort. It was responsible for adjusting the distribution of remaining professional personnel to meet the requirements of the population. In 1943, the Office's title was again changed to the Office of Community War Services, which was abolished on June 30, 1947.

The FDA during the war was charged with maintaining food standards to insure delivery of properly tested foods and drugs to the military establishment. The Public Health Service was in charge of protecting both the general population and military personnel against epidemics and carrying out medical research.

When the war ended, President Truman moved to "strengthen the arm of the federal government for better integration of services in the fields of health, education, and welfare." Reorganization Plan No. 2 of 1946, effective July 16, 1946, replaced the three-member Social Security Board with the Social Security Administration. The plan transferred the Children's Bureau (created in 1912), exclusive of its Industrial Division, from the Department of Labor into SSA; the US Employees Compensation Commission, formerly an independent organization, to the Office of the Administrator of FSA; functions of the Department of Commerce regarding vital statistics to the Public Health Service.

Legislation of major importance to the Agency also was passed in 1946: the National Mental Health Act; the Vocational Education Act; the Federal Employees Health Act; the 1946 Amendments to the Social Security Act; and the Hospital Survey and Construction Act.

In 1947, the Administrator directed the establishment of a central library, consolidating the resources of three independent libraries at the SSA, the Office of Education, and the Office of Vocational Rehabilitation. This library eventually became the central library of the Department of Health, Education, and Welfare.

By 1948, the retail price of food had risen 114 percent over the 1935–39 base, yet the monthly benefits under Social Security had not changed since the 1939 amendments had established a base level. On October 1, 1948, increases in Social Security benefits were authorized. Other key pieces of legislation passed in 1948 included bills creating the National Heart Institute and the National Institute of Dental Research. On June 16, 1948, the name of the National Institute of Health was changed to the National Institutes of Health. On June 30, 1948, the President signed the Water Pollution Bill, delegating national water pollution responsibilities to the Public Health Service. Also in 1948, legislation authorized the transfer of the Federal Credit Union program from the Federal Deposit Insurance Corporation to the SSA.

The Federal Property and Administrative Services Act of 1949 gave the Federal Security Administrator authority to dispose of surplus federal propel property to tax-supported or nonprofit educational institutions for health or educational purposes. Also during 1949, the Federal Security Agency began the establishment of 10 FSA regional offices to replace the 11 previously operated by the SSA and consolidated those being operated by other FSA constituents into one common regional office structure. Previous to the consolidation, constituent agencies were maintaining five and, in some cases, six independent regional offices in a single city.

On May 24, 1950, Reorganization Plan No. 19 of 1950 transferred from FSA to the Department of Labor the Bureau of Employees Compensation and the Employees Compensation Appeals Board. Then, the FSA abolished the Office of Special Services that had administered the two transferred units plus the Office of Vocational Rehabilitation (OVR) and the Food and Drug Administration. The effect of this action was to elevate OVR and FDA to agency status.

In 1950, two important national conferences required months of staff work by FSA personnel. In August of that year, a Conference on Aging was called by the FSA Administrator to study the needs and problems of the older segment of the population. The White House Conference on Children and Youth was held in Washington, D.C., in December 1950. Nearly 6,000 representatives of 100,000 local and community groups throughout the country met to discuss the "spiritual values, democratic practice, and the dignity and worth of the individual."

In September 1950, Congress authorized the impacted aid program-to relieve the impact on local school facilities of a heavy influx of federal civilian and military personnel-and in FY 1951 appropriated $96.5 million for school construction under P.L. 81-815, September 23, 1950, and $23 million for school operating expenses under P.L. 81-874, September 30, 1950.

The Social Security Act Amendments of 1950 added to the social security rolls about 10 million persons who previously had been ineligible. These persons included agricultural workers and selfemployed small shop owners. Others who benefitted from the changes were the elderly and those who had job-related disabilities. This expansion of beneficiaries was made possible by revisions to the old age and survivors insurance and long-term disability insurance sections of the original Act.

In May 1951, a citizens committee, the National Mid-century Committee for Children and Youth, was established to provide national follow-up to the problems discussed at the White House Conference. Staff of the Children's Bureau worked closely with the committee until it was dissolved in 1953.

The year 1952 was a period of transition for FSA. Despite the contributions made by the Agency during and before the Korean War, most of the defense-related activities in FSA were being phased out. The FDA continued to study chemical and bacteriological warfare agents but other FSA components were mobilized to provide disaster relief and health care assistance to a number of foreign countries. Technical assistance, under the Point Four and Mutual Security Agency programs, provided needed help to many underdeveloped countries. The Agency also furnished guidance for foreign representatives sent to this country to study American programs and methods in the fields of health and education. Later in the year, FSA accelerated its response to the Nation's social needs.

== Transformation into DHEW ==
President Harry S. Truman attempted to make the FSA a department of the federal government, but this legislation was defeated.

By 1953, the Federal Security Agency's programs in health, education, and social security had grown to such importance that its annual budget exceeded the combined budgets of the Departments of Commerce, Justice, Labor and Interior and affected the lives of millions of people. Consequently, in accordance with the Reorganization Act of 1949, President Eisenhower submitted to the Congress on March 12, 1953, Reorganization Plan No. 1 of 1953, which called for the dissolution of the Federal Security Agency and elevation of the agency to Cabinet status as the Department of Health, Education, and Welfare. A major objective of the reorganization was to improve administration of the functions of the Federal Security Agency. The plan was approved April 1, 1953, and became effective on April 11, 1953.

Unlike statutes authorizing the creation of other executive departments, the contents of Reorganization Plan No. 1 of 1953 were never properly codified within the United States Code, although Congress did codify a later statute ratifying the Plan. Today, the Plan is included as an appendix to Title 5 of the United States Code. The result is that HHS is the only executive department whose statutory foundation today rests on a confusing combination of several codified and uncodified statutes.

== List of FSA Administrators ==
| Name | Start | End | President |
|---|---|---|---|
| Paul McNutt | July 12, 1939 | September 14, 1945 | Franklin D. Roosevelt (1933–1945) |
| Paul McNutt | July 12, 1939 | September 14, 1945 | Harry S. Truman (1945–1953) |
| Watson Miller | September 14, 1945 | August 19, 1947 | Harry S. Truman (1945–1953) |
| Oscar Ewing | August 19, 1947 | January 20, 1953 | Harry S. Truman (1945–1953) |
| Oveta Hobby | January 20, 1953 | April 11, 1953 | Dwight D. Eisenhower (1953–1961) |

Miller often served as Acting Administrator while McNutt served as both FSA Administrator and Chair of the War Manpower Commission from April 18, 1942.
