= Public administration theory =

Meaning, structure, and function of public service

Public administration theory is a mixture of history, organizational theory, social theory, political theory, and other related subject focusing on the meaning, structure, and function of public service under all circumstances. It often describes the main historical underpinnings of bureaucracy research as well as epistemological issues related to public service as a profession and an education field.

In general, there are three common approaches to appreciation of public administration: Classical Public Administration Theory, New Public Management Theory, and Postmodern Public Administration Theory, each of which offers a different perspective on how an administrator practices public administration.

Important figures of study include: Max Weber, Frederick Winslow Taylor, Luther Gulick, Mary Parker Follett, Chester Barnard, Herbert A. Simon, and Dwight Waldo. Herbert Simon advanced a public administration theory that was informed by positivism. The influence of positivism today can be seen in journals such as the Journal of Public Administration Research and Theory and the Journal of Policy Analysis and Management. Notable public administration theorist such as Max Weber expressed the importance of values in the development of public administration theory. But theories are not simply derived from empirical observations of facts, but must be constructed using value judgments that guide empirical observations and guide interpretations of those observations. Values are essential to the construction of administrative theory because they take into account the culture's wise ethical principles and philosophies that ensure proper theoretical practice. Public administration theories are put into practice or considered through a few distinct strategies: Parallel, Transfer, or Collaboration also known as the theory-gap practice. This practice is used to transfer knowledge between practitioners and scholars.

== Types of Public Administration Theory ==
Three branches exist within the field of public administration theory. Classical public administration theory, New Public Management theory, and Postmodern Public Administration Theory are the three branches. Each strategy is predicated on a unique set of beliefs about how people behave in organizational settings.

=== Classical Public Administration Theory ===
Woodrow Wilson and Max Weber are frequently linked to classical public administration. Woodrow Wilson is regarded as "The Father of Public Administration" in the United States. He wrote "The Study of Administration" in 1887 and made the case that a bureaucracy should be managed similarly to a business. Wilson advocated for concepts like professionalization, a non-political system, and merit-based promotions (since the spoil system was already in place). Since sympathy can bring down an administration, bureaucracy should be practical.

=== New Public Management theory ===
A body of theory, a consulting interest, and a set of administrative methods known as "New Public Management" are used to analyze current changes in public administration. There is a strong case made by many academics that the new public management is more of a theory than a passing trend. [3] The new public administration is an integral part of the widespread infiltration of free market values into public life that threatens the complete eradication of political values. In this way, the idea of bringing political principles into the "private" space to better democratize society is the exact opposite of modern public administration.

== Postmodern Public Administration theory ==
The internal operations of almost all existing government organizations are referred to as post-modern public administration. Even members of Congress in Washington, D.C. or Department of Public Safety staff members who handle paperwork for applicants seeking a driver's license at any DPS location. Public administration is a broad concept to include all functions in the executive branch that have an impact on the general public.. Members of public administration come in different forms and quantities. When understanding the theory of postmodern public administration, it is important to make a differentiation between postmodern theory and the postmodern era as well as being able to differentiate between post-modernity (period of time) and postmodernism (theory/philosophy).

Postmodern theory evolves out of the postmodern era. Chuck Fox and Hugh Miller are two of the main contributors to postmodern theory because they were able to recognize the postmodern condition and how it was playing out in public administration and public policy. Fox and Miller argue that the traditional approach to public administration "robs public administration theorists of the independence required to imagine more emancipating conditions of work and governance." Miller proposes a network model based on economic utility which would explain events better than traditional approach to public administration. Miller states that "policy networks provide a way of processing dissension, articulating values, and airing possible policy implementation strategies. Maneuvering on behalf of the public interest in this complex politically subtle network is the task of post-progressive public administration." This theory began in the 1990s, even though this theory had been around in other disciplines for a while. An estimation of time could date back to Plato and his ideas of a public and communal government where there are policy making actions and steps through levels of democracy. This theory has since been revisited and changed through three intellectual movements, interrogating the loop model of democracy, which many have argued that it is largely a myth, showing the symbolic nature of policy and politics in the United States, and discourse theory. One of the downsides of this theory is that it is based on the slippery slope of relativism. This theory also provides people with the tools to rebuild our infrastructures of symbolic and social order. This theory addresses big questions of what is right and wrong and tries to address the issue to find antidotes for anomie and relativity.

The founding father of postmodern public administration is commonly referred to as Woodrow Wilson, while many can find his roots of inspiration from the works of Friedrich Nietzsche. Using Woodrow Wilson as a reference point, it can be shown that in his essay The Study of Administration, is it “traditionally accepted that with his study, Wilson applied positivist principles to public administration…based on the belief that social reality would be objectively known with the separation of positivist traditional values from facts.” (Traces of Postmodernism in the New Public Management Paradigm, Kerim Ozcan-Veysel Agca).

== Public Administration theory development ==
Public Administration theory is derived from several contemporary theory building tools such as Max Weber's Ideal type method. Theories are also derived from studies of evolving governments around the world, such as China's expanding bureaucracy. Different aspects to take into account are: accountability, state-citizen relations, and services for all in times of fiscal scarcity. When developing theories, the most effective theories are the ones tailored for a particular country taking aspects such as values into account. When empirical evidence is the only aspect taken into account it leads to an ineffective policy because the theory will not reflect the values of the citizens, resulting in bad citizen- state relationships. The Theory-Gap Practice is used to analyze the correlations between Public Administration theory and practice. The three fields of the theory gap-practice that describe the relationship between scholars and practitioners are: Parallel, Transfer, and Collaboration strategy.

=== Max Weber's ideal-type method ===
The ideal-type method developed by Max Weber is a useful tool in contemporary public administration theory development because the method takes into account the culture of a society that is then integrated into a theory. Weber referred to it as cultural science or interpretive sociology, which, is to understand ideas and practices from within their own intellectual and cultural horizon and on the basis of categories that are grounded in a meaningful social and historical context. According to Margaret Stout, Ideal-type methods are used to frame observation and analysis and to evaluate what is found. Weber's method must be developed using value judgments that direct our empirical observations and then guide our interpretation of those observations. Through this theory building method, Weber insisted that all interpretations of meaning must remain at best "a peculiarly plausible hypothesis", as opposed to a claim of relevance of a theory. Weber's purpose for using this method is to clarify the importance of values in sense making, but how they are also extremely important for the conduct of meaningful social science. Weber’s interpretive sociology employs a type of functional analysis that begins with the whole, proceeds to the parts, and then goes back from the parts to the whole. His ideal-type method is thereby simultaneously useful in both the study of social structure and social action. Social action is linked to subjective meaning at the individual level of analysis, and structural forms are a consequence or construction of social action. This combination is particularly valuable to public administration because the manner in which administrative action and the social structures of governance interrelate requires an approach that considers both. On the one hand, ideal-types enable consideration of things like alternative meanings of important concepts or alternative motivations held by social actors. On the other hand, they enable analysis of associated or resulting social structures. In this way, an ideal-type can concurrently help interpret the meaning of the administrative role as well as critique the institutions of governance.

=== Theory-gap practice ===
Parallel- Proponents of this strategy of relating theory and practice believe that practical knowledge cannot be derived from theories. For the practitioners of this strategy, practice and theory remain separate components of knowledge. Practical knowledge aims to how to handle problems in particular situations while theory aims at handling a specific situation in a general set of principles. Advocates for the parallel strategy claim there can be a complementary relationship between practical and theoretical knowledge or that they can substitute each other in certain situations because particular situations will require practice and theory to work together. Thus advocates that champion parallel strategy argue that it is essential for management studies to maintain an autonomous communication system.

Transfer- This second strategy frames the theory-practice problem as one of translating and diffusing research knowledge into management. This strategy confronts the issue of public managers lack of interest or studying of the work of scholars. This is the result of the scholarly work not being easily applicable to practice, and the complexity of the journals, thus knowledge is not being transferred from theory to practice. The transfer strategy proponents claim the popularizing the scholarly work, and making it more relevant to current issues faced in public administration would enhance the transfer of knowledge from scholars to street level bureaucrats and public managers. However, some argue this approach falls short of expectations because many practitioners of public administration have little influence on the content of knowledge offered by scholars.

Collaboration- This strategy aims to enhance communication between scholars and practitioners before the theory is developed in order to build a dialectic method of inquiry, building on the idea that communication is necessary throughout the whole theory building process in order to have a well development practical theory. Scholars Van de Ven and P.E. Johnson put it as:

"Engagement is relationship that involves negotiation and collaboration between researchers and practitioners in a learning community; such a community jointly produces knowledge that can both advance the scientific enterprise and enlighten a community of practitioners."

== Important figures in public administration theory ==
=== Max Weber ===
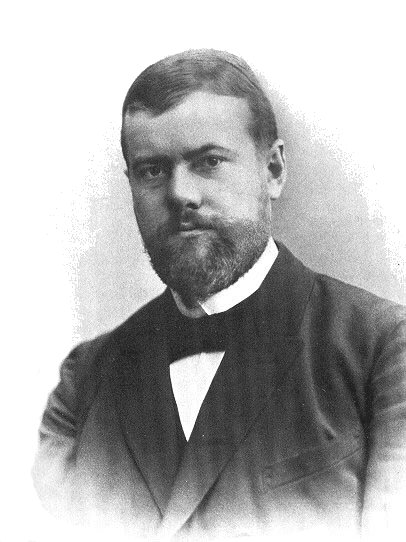
Max Weber, one of the many theorists.

Max Weber was a German political economist, social scientist, and renowned Philosopher is an important father to the theory of Public Administration and the bureaucratic side of it. He did extensive research studying ancient and modern states to gather a better perspective of bureaucracies in multiple eras for his Magnum Opus Economy and Society published in 1922. That piece of work has contributed countless insight into the Public Administration Theory. Max Weber considered bureaucracy to be the most rational form of administration yet devised by man. In his writings he asserts that domination is exerted through administration and that for legal domination to take place bureaucracy is required.

=== Woodrow Wilson ===
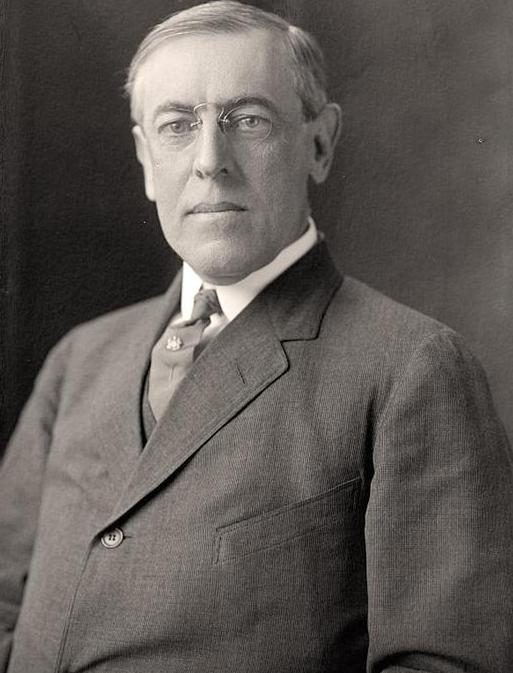
Thomas Woodrow Wilson, another one of the theorists of Public Administration.

Woodrow Wilson defined public administration as a detailed and systematic execution of public law, he divided government institutions into two separate sectors, administration and politics. According to him politics is dealt with policy formulation and questions regarding such, whereas administration is equipped with carrying said policies out. In his own words in his early essay, "The Study of Administration" he said "it is getting to be harder to run a constitution than to frame one." Wilson very much so tried to establish a distinction between politics and administration; he saw administration as a field of business which lies outside politics. He thought the theory of public administration existed simply because of technicalities and was around for the behind the scenes business aspect of politics.

=== Frederick Winslow Taylor ===
Frederick Taylor was an engineer by profession who saw much of life from a scientific aspect. He is a popular less conservative contributor to the Theory of Public Administration in that he produced his own, very popular, theory of traditional public administration, The Scientific Management Theory. He was concerned with finding the best and most efficient way to complete a task for a particular job, reducing the overall labor a worker had to exert with the least amount of movements. Frederick Taylors work approached motivation with a very authoritative, cold, scientific motivator which weighed heavy over any sort of humane aspect to scientific management. Overall many intricacies in Public Administration such as management, control and accounting are subject to scientific principles and Taylor draws on these to find his own, efficient theory approach to Public Administration Theory.

== Public administration theory in practice ==
=== Classical public administration- United States ===
Often considered the best way for organizing public sector work, it was used highly in the western world in the 19th and early 20th century. A differing proponent between America and Europe is the transferring of effective management methods between large private and public organizations. The first effective theory in America was Scientific Theory coined by Frederick W. Taylor in 1911. His work "Principles and Methods of Scientific Management" was used to implement ideas that would increase the efficiency of American government. Taylor's ideas of standardizing work, systematic control, and a hierarchical organization were perfect fits for the public sector of the 1940s.^{[5]}

=== New public management - United Kingdom ===
New Public Management was the prominent theory that inspired health care reforms for the United Kingdom. Its application to health care coincided with the growing expenditures that were being made due to the progress of technology and an aging population. The difference between the private and public sectors in terms of budget process and ideology provided a clash of interests. 1990 saw the National Health Service create an internal market of separate care providers and hospitals. This creation of markets in turn stopped the state from being the funder and service provider simultaneously, but just primarily the funder. Although not privatized, these markets became competitive in nature. The assumption that the competition would lead to more empowerment, efficiency, and equity became rampant. Soon, the publicly owned hospitals were granted quasi-autonomous status by the district health authorities, leading to competition for patients and funds. Their status has led to little, if any, interference in everyday operations.

=== Postmodern public administration - United States ===
Postmodern Public Administration is linked to the capitalist model of the late 20th and 21st century. It relates to globalization, consumerism, and the fragmentation of authority and state. The concepts of science and reason are de-centered and viewed as the defining truths. It tends to negate any faith based actions.^{[7]}

== See also ==
- Lean Government
