= Committee on Department Methods =

1905 United States commission on governmental efficiency

The Committee on Department Methods, popularly known as the Keep Commission, was appointed by President Theodore Roosevelt in 1905. The Commission's members were Charles H. Keep, Assistant Secretary of the Treasury and Chairman of the Commission, James R. Garfield, Gifford Pinchot, Frank H. Hitchcock and Lawrence O. Murray. The Commission represented the first assertion by a President that the President is responsible for administration.

== Establishment of the Committee ==
The Commission was generally charged with improving the administration of government services by investigating the administrative best practices of the day. Specifically, it was charged with examining salary classifications, purchasing procedures, accounting procedures, cost accounting, and generally more uniform and efficient business methods.

The need for the Commission was documented in Roosevelt's autobiography when he heard the story of an officer who was in charge of a Bureau of Indian Affairs district office: "The story reached him concerning a requisition in 1904 by an officer in charge of a Bureau of Indian Affairs' district office for a stove costing seven dollars. Submitting it in early autumn, the official certified that the stove was vitally needed to keep the infirmary warm during the winter months and that the old stove was worn out and useless. The papers were processed through all their travels in the usual routine, and the stove was authorized and sent out. When the stove reached the district office he acknowledged its receipt according to the proper procedure. 'The stove is here,' he wrote, 'and so is spring.'"

Ultimately, the Commission formed 12 subcommittees which were composed of about 70 functional experts employed by the government. The Commission also investigated scandals in the Government Printing Office and the Department of Agriculture. Its primary work, though, was administrative process improvement.

== Notable recommendation ==
- Personnel system improvement, including salary reclassification, efficiency ratings, retirement system for federal employees, uniform regulation for time and leave practices
- Purchasing and contracting procedure modification
- Coordination of statistics
- Records management, including the idea of a "National Archival House"
- Accounting system improvement, including double book entry accounting in the Department of the Treasury which became the first instance of the accounting method in the U.S. government, the use of adding machines, consolidated accounting statements (prior accounts had been kept according to appropriations), official bond standardization, streamlined checks and voucher procedures
- Standardized governmental transportation procedures
- Inter-departmental relations and work duplication minimization

== Reactions to the Commission ==
Since none of the members of the Keep Commission were even Presidential Cabinet Members, it seems that some of the Cabinet members were quite embarrassed by the results but others such as the Department of the Interior and the Department of Commerce took the recommendations of the Commission seriously and even encouraged more investigation. The President's direct involvement and support of the Commission seems to have kept dissension to the report to a minimum from the cabinet. However, since the Commission was not sanctioned by Congress, the Cabinet members were free to ignore some recommendations.

Congress was suspicious and threatened by the work of the Commission because they saw it as an attempt to consolidate presidential power. They were so threatened, in fact, that they refused to allow the reports of the Commission and its subcommittees to be officially published and it passed an amendment to the Sundry Civil Expenses Appropriation Bill that forbade future expenditures by any committee or commission that had not been authorized by Congress. Presidents continue to deny that Congress has the authority to direct administration in this way.

The public perception of the Commission was that it was primarily engaged in an investigation into graft and corruption in government. President Roosevelt, however, maintained that the Commission "thoroughly overhauled" the business of government. When it appropriated funds to President William Howard Taft, Congress implicitly accepted the view stated by Roosevelt and the Keep Commission that administration was an executive responsibility.

== See also ==
- Presidential commission (United States)
- Public administration
- Commission on Economy and Efficiency
