= Library of Congress Country Studies =

Series of creative works

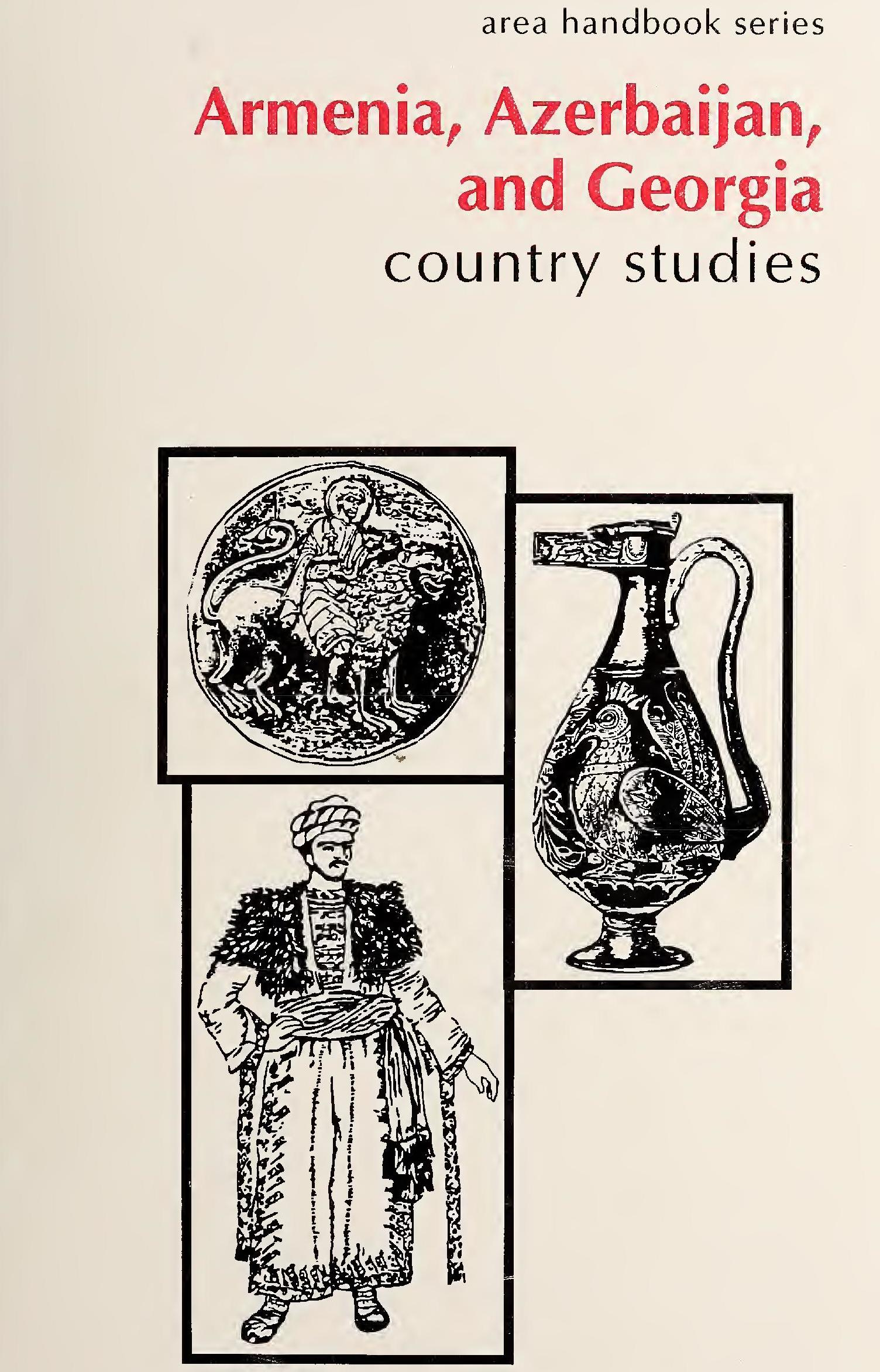
A Country Studies book from 1995

The Country Studies are works published by the Federal Research Division of the United States Library of Congress, freely available for use by researchers. No copyright is claimed on them. Therefore, they have been dedicated to the public domain and can be copied freely, though not all the pictures used therein are in the public domain. The Country Studies Series presents a description and analysis of the historical setting and the social, economic, political, and national security systems and institutions of countries throughout the world. The series examines the interrelationships of those systems and the ways they are shaped by cultural factors.

The books represent the analysis of the authors and should not be construed as an expression of an official United States Government position, policy, or decision. The authors have sought to adhere to accepted standards of scholarly objectivity.

Online information contained in the online Country Studies is not copyrighted and thus is available for free and unrestricted use by researchers. As a courtesy, however, appropriate credit should be given to the series. The material may be copied into Wikipedia, but its plagiarism rule requires explicit credit be given.

Hard-copy editions of all books in the series (except the regional studies on Macau and Afghanistan) can be ordered from the Superintendent of Documents, U.S. Government Publishing Office at the U.S. Government Bookstore.

The last appropriation for the program was in fiscal year 2004. In response to this one-time infusion "...the Federal Research Division initiated action to produce five new Country Studies, as well as a number of shorter, updated Country Profiles. All of that work continues, but in the absence of renewed funding ... no additional work can be initiated."

== Countries with published studies ==
This is a list of countries for which studies are available at LOCCS, not links to such studies.

- Afghanistan
- Albania
- Algeria
- Angola
- Armenia
- Austria
- Azerbaijan
- Bahrain
- Bangladesh
- Belarus
- Belize
- Bhutan
- Bolivia
- Brazil
- Bulgaria 1974 Area Handbook; 1992 Country Study;
- Cambodia
- Caribbean Islands
- Chad
- Chile
- China
- Colombia
- Comoros
- Ivory Coast
- Cyprus
- Czechoslovakia (former)
- Cuba - Area Handbooks 1971, 1976; Country Studies 1987, 2002
- Dominican Republic
- Ecuador
- Egypt
- El Salvador
- Estonia
- Ethiopia
- Finland
- Georgia
- Germany
- Germany, East (former)
- Ghana
- Guyana
- Haiti
- Honduras
- Hungary
- India
- Indonesia
- Iran (also Army Area Handbooks 1964, 1971)
- Iraq
- Israel
- Italy
- Japan
- Jordan
- Kazakhstan
- Kuwait
- Kyrgyzstan
- Latvia
- Laos
- Lebanon
- Liberia—country study 1985, earlier editions 1960s, 1970s
- Libya
- Lithuania
- Macau
- Madagascar
- Maldives
- Mauritania
- Mauritius
- Mexico
- Moldova
- Mongolia
- Nepal
- Nicaragua
- Nigeria
- North Korea
- Oman
- Pakistan
- Panama
- Paraguay
- Peru
- Philippines
- Poland
- Portugal
- Qatar
- Romania 1972 Area Handbook
- Russia
- Rwanda (Army Area Handbook 1968)
- Saudi Arabia
- Seychelles
- Singapore
- Somalia
- South Africa
- South Korea
- South Vietnam (former)
- Soviet Union (former)
- Spain
- Sri Lanka
- Sudan
- Syria
- Tajikistan
- Thailand
- Turkmenistan
- Turkey
- Uganda
- United Arab Emirates
- Uruguay
- Uzbekistan
- Venezuela
- Vietnam
- Yugoslavia (former)
- Zaire (former)

== See also ==
- The World Factbook
