= Tangherlini =

Tangherlini is a surname. Notable people with the surname include:

- Dan Tangherlini (born c. 1967), former Administrator of the United States General Services Administration
- Frank Tangherlini, physicist who extended the Schwarzschild metric to higher dimensions
