= Emily W. Murphy =

American government official (born 1973)

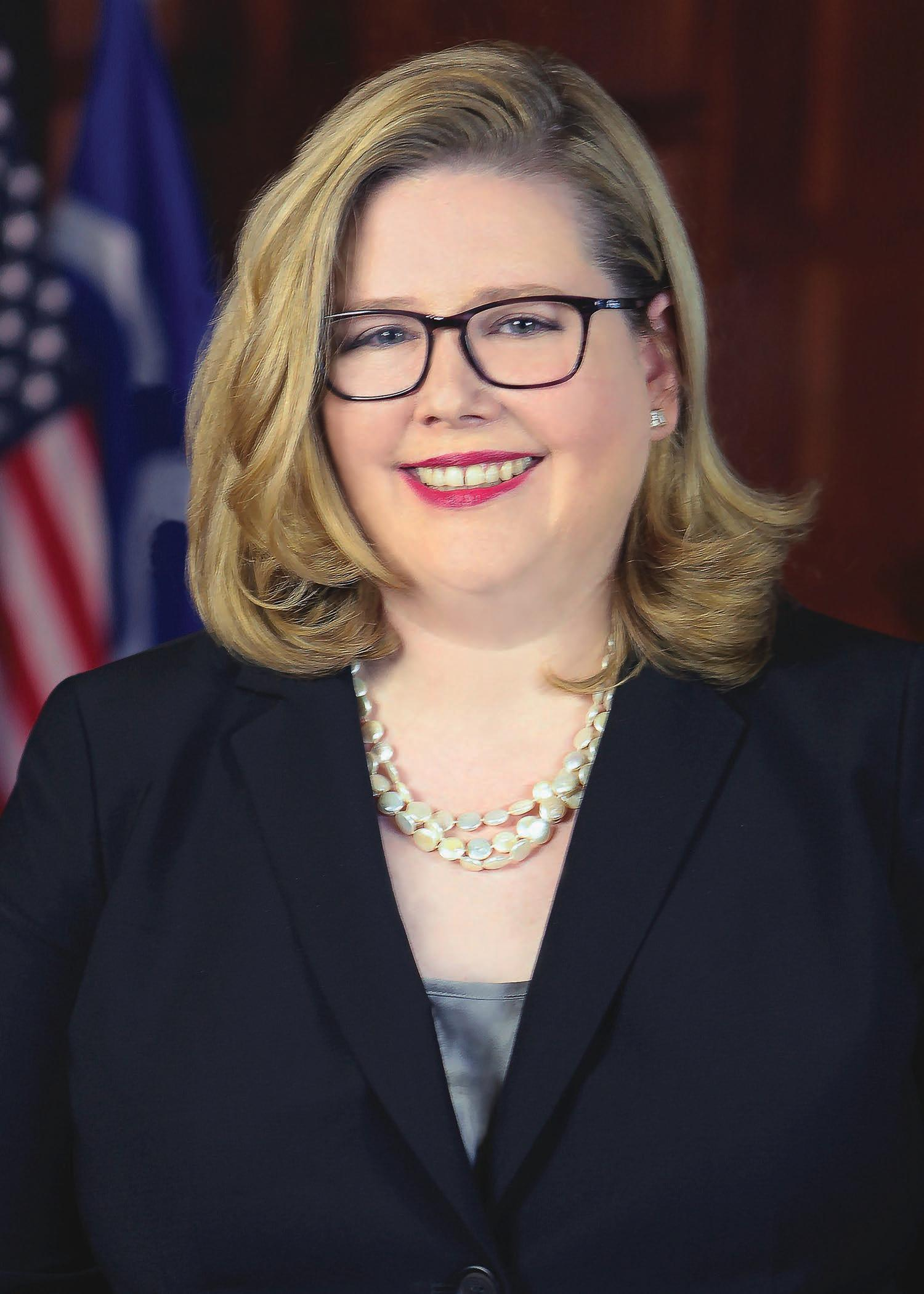

Administrator of General Services
- In office December 12, 2017 – January 15, 2021
- President: Donald Trump
- Deputy: Allison Brigati
- Preceded by: Denise Turner Roth
- Succeeded by: Robin Carnahan

Personal details
- Born: Emily Webster Murphy; 1973 (age 52–53) St. Louis, Missouri, U.S.
- Party: Republican
- Education: Smith College (BA); University of Virginia (JD)

Emily Webster Murphy (born 1973) is an American attorney and former government official who served as the administrator of the General Services Administration (GSA) from 2017 to 2021. Before serving in the GSA, Murphy was an attorney for the Republican National Committee and worked for several congressional committees and executive departments in the field of acquisition policy.

She was appointed as GSA administrator in 2017 by President Donald Trump. She came under scrutiny after the 2020 presidential election for her delay in starting the presidential transition to the Biden's transition team after Joe Biden won the election on November 7. Murphy initially refused to sign a letter allowing Biden's transition team to access federal agencies and transition funds; this came as Trump refused to acknowledge Biden's victory. She eventually signed the letter on November 23, allowing the presidential transition process to begin.

Because of the transition delay, the Electoral Count Act was modified to include a provision to remove the power of the GSA administrator to delay access and funds.

== Early life and education ==
Murphy was born in 1973 and raised in St. Louis, Missouri. She has a brother and a sister. Her father James J. Murphy Jr. was chairman of Murphy Company Mechanical Contractors and Engineers, and her mother, Mimi Murphy (née Webster), was an attorney. Murphy attended Villa Duchesne and Oak Hill School, from which she graduated in 1991. She received a Bachelor of Arts from Smith College in 1995 and a Juris Doctor from the University of Virginia School of Law in 2001.

== Early career ==
After graduating from Smith, Murphy moved to Washington, D.C., beginning her career at the Republican National Committee (RNC). She worked for the RNC as Assistant to the Director of Administration from October 1995 to January 1997. She then worked as a staff member for conservative Republican Jim Talent, while he served as Chair of the House Committee on Small Business from January 1997 to July 1998, before leaving to attend law school.

Murphy previously served as counsel at the United States House Committee on Armed Services, where she specialized in acquisition policy and reform. She has also held roles at the Small Business Administration and at GSA, where she served as the agency's Chief Acquisition Officer from 2005 to 2007. During this stint, she attended a 2007 briefing of GSA political appointees by Karl Rove. During the briefing, then GSA administrator Lurita Doan asked those in attendance how the GSA could be used "to help our candidates." Murphy was among several attendees who reported the incident as a violation of the Hatch Act, and Doan was asked to resign by President George W. Bush.

She served under three chairmen of the United States House Committee on Small Business. Her private sector experience includes five years in executive positions at a technology startup company engaged in federal contracting and three years as a government contracts attorney with two D.C. law firms.

== General Services Administration leadership ==
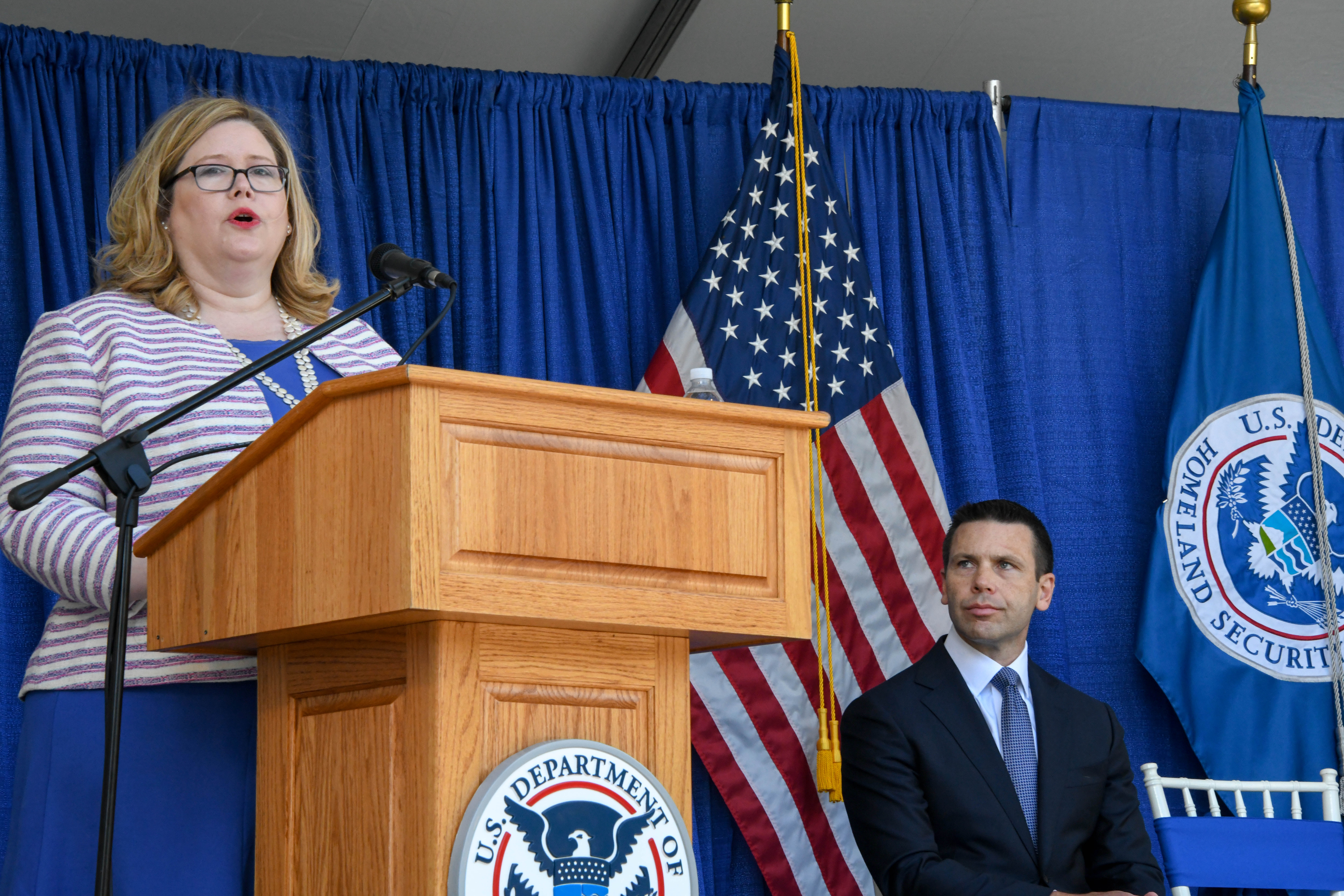
Murphy at the ribbon cutting ceremony for the Department of Homeland Security St. Elizabeths Campus.

After President Trump took office in January 2017, Murphy was appointed to the position of senior advisor to acting General Services Administration administrator Timothy Horne. On September 2, 2017, Trump nominated Murphy to the post of GSA administrator. The Senate confirmed Murphy's appointment by unanimous consent on December 5, 2017. Murphy succeeded Obama appointee Denise Turner Roth.

In March 2018, an Inspector General's report found that Murphy had a policy of permitting alcohol consumption in her office by employees after working hours on Fridays.

In 2018, Murphy became involved in a dispute surrounding a decision to cancel plans to move the Federal Bureau of Investigation headquarters to outside of Washington, D.C., and to sell the land on which the J. Edgar Hoover Building stands. The land would be for development. Instead, a more expensive rebuild at the existing location was proposed. House Democrats alleged that this decision was influenced by Trump's desire to prevent a rival hotel being built on Pennsylvania Avenue. Murphy faced questions at a 2018 congressional hearing regarding the White House's involvement in this decision; she said that Trump was not involved in the decision and that the direction was received from the FBI. A GSA Inspector General report published in August 2018 revealed Murphy's testimony "left the misleading impression that she had no discussions with the President or senior White House officials in the decision-making process about the project"; Murphy had failed to disclose her meetings with the president on two occasions regarding the project, and one with his Chief of Staff John Kelly.

Murphy left the White House on January 15, 2021, before Trump's term expired. On April 6, 2021, President Joe Biden nominated Robin Carnahan to serve as the administrator of the General Services Administration. After confirmation by the United States Senate, Carnahan was sworn into office on July 2, 2021.

In 2021, Murphy was hired by George Mason University as a Senior Fellow in the school of business's Center for Government Contracting.

=== 2020 presidential transition ===
Murphy's letter to Joe Biden notifying him of her decision to permit his transition team access to U.S. federal resources for the transition of the presidency of Donald Trump to the presidency of Joe Biden.

The GSA administrator is the government official responsible for "ascertaining" the existence of an upcoming transition of the presidency, thus permitting the president-elect and their staff access to federal agencies and transition funds. After November 7, 2020, when Joe Biden became generally acknowledged as the winner of the 2020 election, Murphy did not immediately issue a letter doing so, thus blocking Biden's transition team from the federal support needed to facilitate an orderly transition of power.

Before the 2020 election, Murphy spoke with David Barram, who was President Bill Clinton's GSA administrator during the 2000 election, about the appropriate steps to take during a possible transition of power. On November 10, four former Secretaries of Homeland Security—Tom Ridge, Michael Chertoff, Janet Napolitano, and Jeh Johnson—called upon Murphy to initiate the transition. On November 19, the Chair of the House Committee on Oversight and Reform formally requested that Murphy brief Congress "on [her] ongoing refusal to grant the Biden-Harris Transition Team access to critical services and facilities". The next day, House Democrats sent Murphy a letter reading that her inaction was "undermining the orderly transfer of power, impairing the incoming Administration's ability to respond to the coronavirus pandemic, hampering its ability to address our nation's dire economic crisis, and endangering our national security."

On November 23, after Michigan certified its results, Murphy issued the letter of ascertainment, granting the Biden transition team access to federal funds and resources for an orderly transition. Breaking with recent precedent, the letter did not call Biden "president-elect", instead fulfilling Murphy's requirements under the Act without implying that he won the election. In the letter Murphy called the Act "vague", recommended Congress "consider amendments to the Act" to improve the standard it sets for post-election allocation of resources, and described threats she had allegedly received pressuring her to act. The Washington Post called the letter "unusually personal".

Because of the transition delay, the Electoral Count Act was modified to include a provision to remove the power of the GSA administrator to delay access and funds.
