= Franklin G. Floete =

American businessman

3rd Administrator of the General Services Administration
- In office May 3, 1956 – January 20, 1961
- President: Dwight D. Eisenhower
- Preceded by: Edmund F. Mansure
- Succeeded by: John Moore

2nd Assistant Secretary of Defense for Properties and Installations
- In office August 3, 1953 – March 4, 1956
- President: Dwight D. Eisenhower
- Preceded by: Frank Creedon
- Succeeded by: Floyd S. Bryant

Personal details
- Born: May 30, 1887 Armour, South Dakota
- Died: September 21, 1973 (aged 84) Palo Alto, California
- Party: Republican

Franklin G. Floete (May 30, 1887 – September 21, 1973) was an American businessman who served as the Assistant Secretary of Defense for Properties and Installations from 1953 to 1956 and as Administrator of the General Services Administration from 1956 to 1961. He was born on May 30, 1887, in Armour, South Dakota. He died on September 21, 1973, at his home in Palo Alto, California after a long illness.

He graduated from the University of Wisconsin-Madison and Harvard Law School.
