= Denise Turner Roth =

American government official

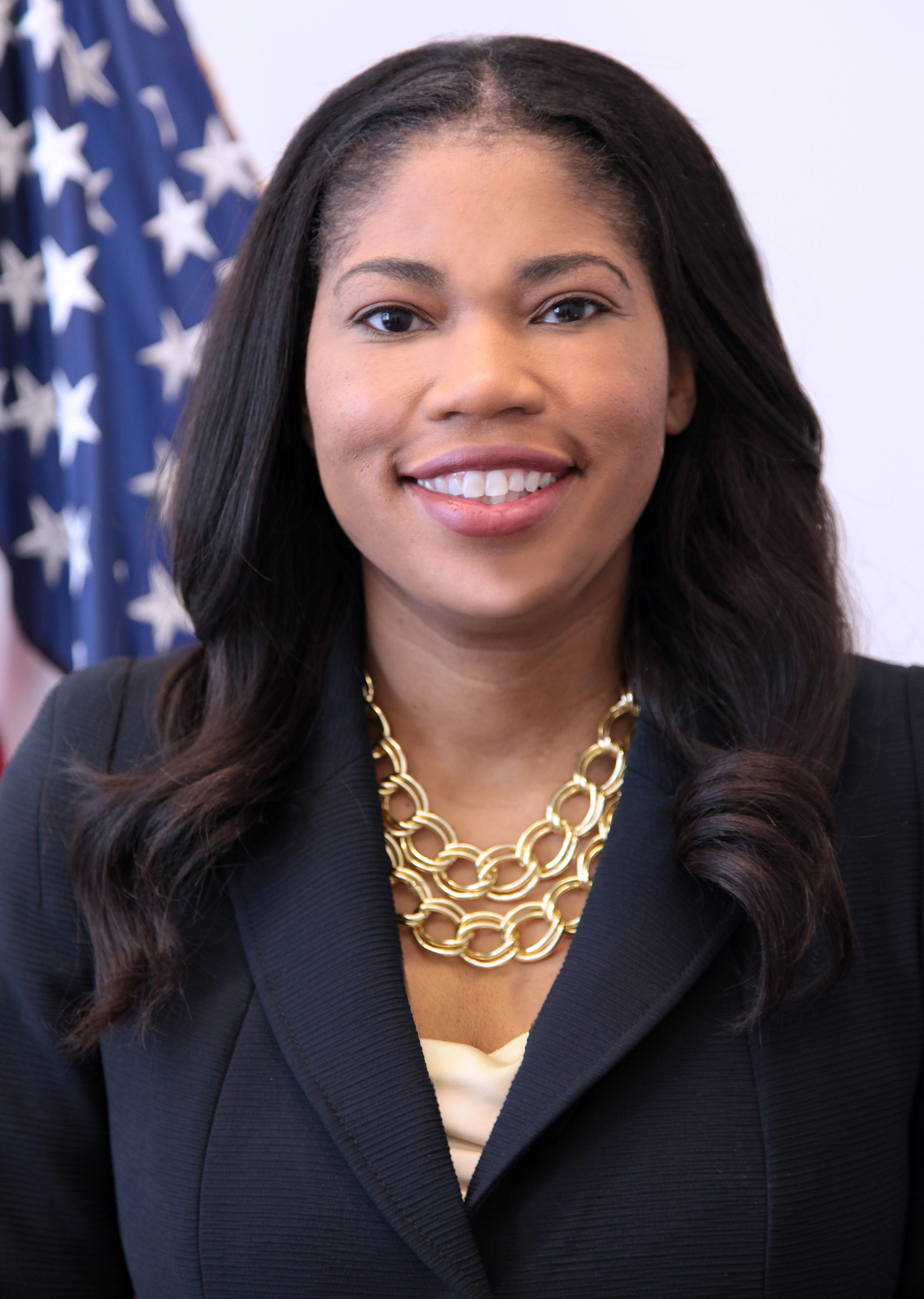

Administrator of General Services
- In office August 5, 2015 – January 20, 2017
- President: Barack Obama
- Preceded by: Dan Tangherlini
- Succeeded by: Emily W. Murphy

Personal details
- Born: c. 1974 (age 49–50) Washington, D.C., U.S.
- Education: George Mason University (BA); University of North Carolina at Chapel Hill (GrDip)

Denise Turner Roth (born 1974) is an American government official who served as Administrator of General Services Administration from 2015 to January 2017. Her appointment to that position was confirmed in August 2015.

== Early life and education ==
Born in Washington, D.C., Roth attended Bishop O'Connell High School in Arlington, VA. Roth earned a Bachelor of Arts degree in political science from George Mason University and a graduate diploma from the Public Executive Leadership Academy at the University of North Carolina at Chapel Hill.

== Career ==
Before joining the General Services Administration, Roth worked as the Greensboro, North Carolina City Manager. In 2015, Roth was nominated to serve as Administrator of the General Services Administration, succeeding Dan Tangherlini, who had been serving in an acting capacity. Roth left the GSA shortly after the 2017 inauguration of Donald Trump to work as a senior advisor and chief development officer at WSP USA, a design and engineering firm.

Roth returned to Greensboro politics, serving as an at-large member of the Greensboro city council, after securing the most votes in the 2025 Greensboro municipal election on November 4, 2025.

Political offices
Preceded by Dan Tangherlini; Acting	Administrator of General Services; 2015–2017	Incumbent
