= David Bibb =

American civil servant

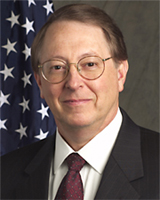
- David L. Bibb Official Photo
- Education: Florida State University; Austin Peay State University
- Occupation: Acting Administrator of the General Services Administration

David L. Bibb, an American civil servant, served as the Deputy Administrator of the General Services Administration (GSA), which is an independent agency of the United States government, and as its Acting Administrator twice. He was appointed Deputy Administrator on December 16, 2003. During the 2003-2008 time frame, he served as Acting Administrator from November 2005 to May 2006 and May to August 2008, reporting to the President. He held a number of other key positions at GSA prior to becoming Deputy Administrator, including Deputy Commissioner of the Public Buildings Service and Deputy Associate Administrator for Real Property Policy, a job with government-wide responsibilities.

Bibb joined the GSA's Atlanta office as a management intern in 1971. He was a recipient of the Presidential Rank Award of Distinguished Executive and a two-time recipient of the Presidential Rank Award of Meritorious Executive. He twice received the GSA Administrator's Distinguished Service Award, the agency's highest honor. He graduated from Austin Peay State University in Clarksville, Tennessee, and received a Master of Science from Florida State University in 1973.

During his years at GSA, Bibb concurrently served two terms as chairman of the U. S. Access Board and two terms as its vice-chair. The Board is a federal agency that promotes equality for people with disabilities through leadership in accessible design and the development of accessibility guidelines and standards. These standards apply to all agencies across the federal government, as well as to many activities outside the government throughout American society. The Board's jurisdiction includes the built environment, transportation, communication, medical diagnostic equipment, and information technology. He led a group of 13 Presidential appointees and 12 senior federal executives from numerous federal agencies, as well as a professional staff.

While at GSA, Bibb was the agency's Environmental Executive and Advocate, was a member of the Board of the Washington-area Combined Federal Campaign; served three terms as chair of The Workplace Network, an organization of government agencies from across the world that provide similar services to those of GSA for their national governments; and worked closely with his private-sector colleagues as Government Advisor to the Board of CoreNet Global and as a member of the National Advisory Committee of the Building Owners and Managers Association.

Following his retirement from the federal government in 2008, Bibb joined NGP Management LLC as executive vice president, a position which he still holds.

He has been married to the former Rebecca Taylor since 1971, and is the father of a daughter, Elizabeth; a son, Jonathan; and four grandchildren, Hudson, Willa, Benjamin, and Santiago.

Political offices
Preceded by Stephen A. Perry	Administrator of General Services; Acting; 2005-2006	Succeeded by Lurita Doan
Preceded by Lurita Doan	Administrator of General Services; Acting; 2008	Succeeded by James A. Williams; Acting
