= Ernest C. Bairstow =

American sculptor

Ernest Cecil Bairstow
- Born: 2 April 1876; Queensbury-Clayton, England
- Died: 13 September 1962 (aged 86); Washington, D.C.
- Occupation: Sculptor
- Known for: Lincoln Memorial

Ernest Cecil Bairstow (1876–1962) was an English-born American architectural sculptor noted for work on buildings in Washington, D.C., including the Lincoln Memorial.

== Career ==
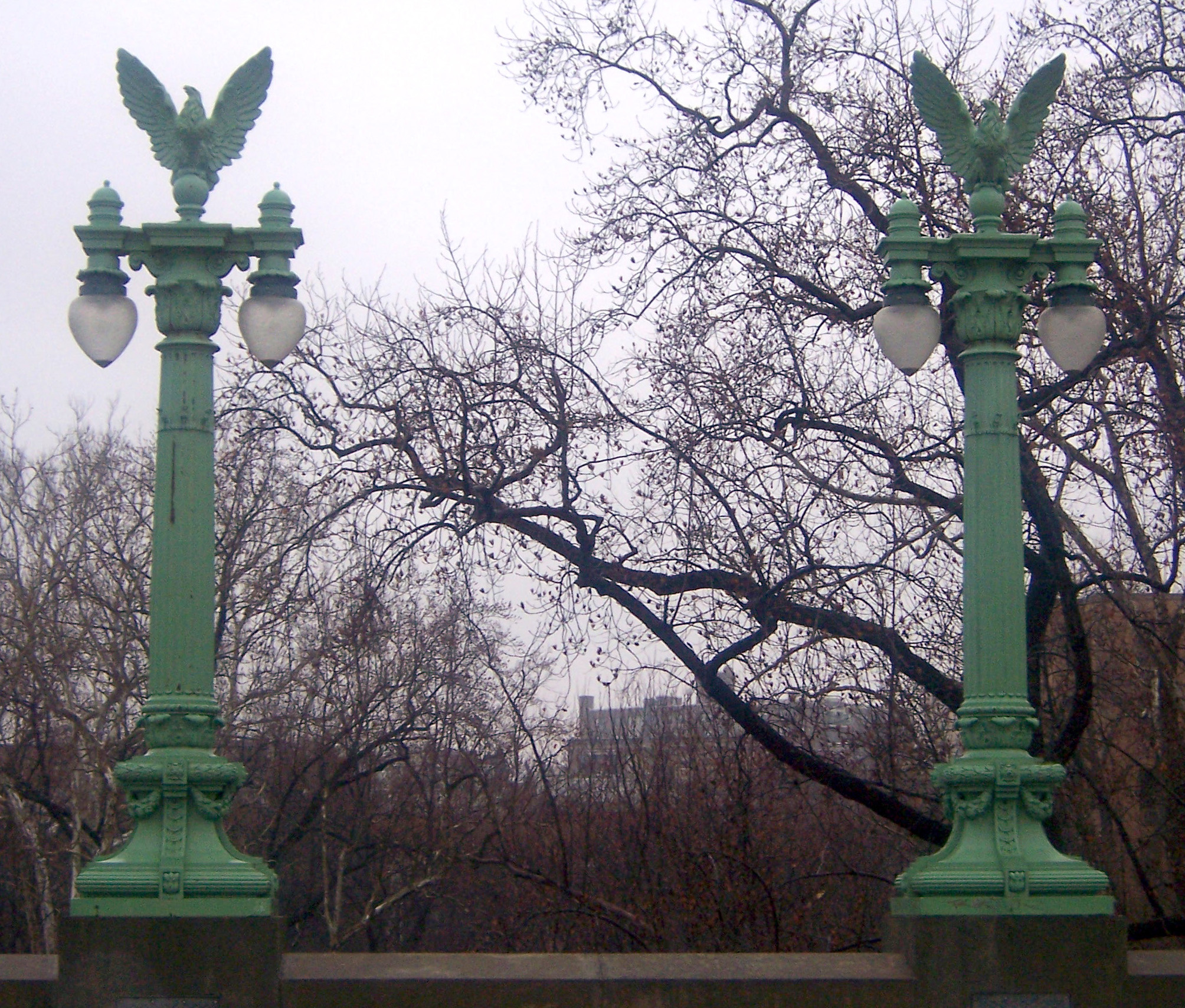
Eagle lampposts at the Taft Bridge in Washington

Ernest Cecil Bairstow was born in Queensbury-Clayton, Yorkshire, England, in 1876 to Mary (née Cockroft) and Henry Bairstow.

Bairstow assisted Adolfo De Nesti (1870-1935) of Florence with the statuary of the District (Wilson) Building in Washington DC, was constructed between 1902 and 1908. Its allegorical attic figures represent Sculpture, Painting, Architecture, Music, Commerce, Engineering, Agriculture and Statesmanship. The building is an excellent example of American Beaux Arts Classicism, and has been designated a Category II landmark of importance.

Around 1906, Bairstow created the Eagle lampposts at the Taft Bridge (Connecticut Avenue Bridge) in Washington. The lamps were cast by the J. L. Motts Iron Works, New York. The lions were made by sculptor Roland Hinton Perry.

Bairstow created plaster composition figures of the muses that were installed in arches over boxes on each side of the stage of the Gayety Theater in Washington. The theater was completed in 1907, designed by architect William H. McElfatrick (1854-1922). The theater originally was a member of the Columbia Circuit of Burlesque theaters. After going through many changes, the theater was torn down in November 1959.

The United States General Services Administration Building, originally designed for the U.S. Department of the Interior, was built between 1915 and 1917. Bairstow carved the eagle over the central opening, designed the twenty-eight limestone panels in the frieze on the sixth story, and undertook the ornamental work on the F Street entrances. In 1986 the building was listed in the National Register of Historic Places.

Bairstow carved the exterior decoration of the Lincoln Memorial and the inscriptions inside between 1914 and 1922.

Ernest Cecil Bairstow died in 1962 and is buried in Glenwood Cemetery.

== Lincoln Memorial ==
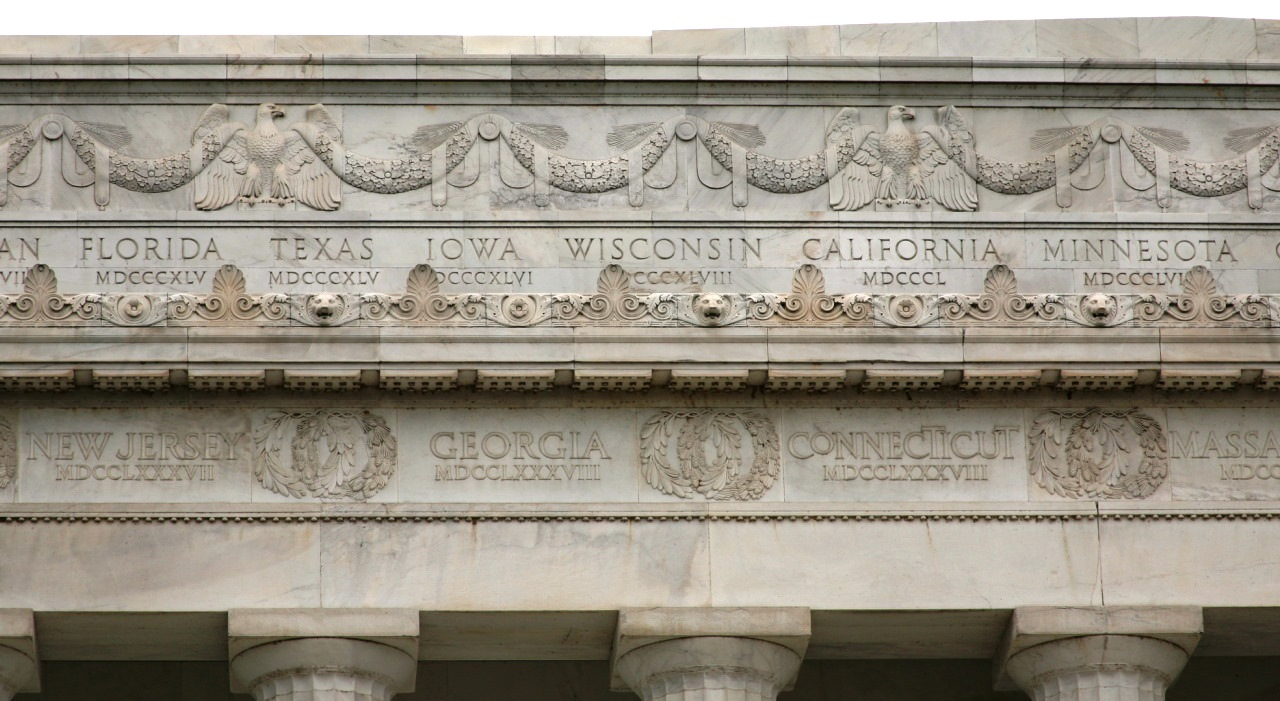
Detail of the bas-relief frieze on the Lincoln Memorial

The neoclassical Lincoln Memorial in Washington was designed by Henry Bacon, Work started on 12 February 1914 and the work was dedicated on 30 May 1922. Bairstow undertook the carvings on the exterior of the monument, including eagles, festoons, wreathes and the states. Bairstow began to carve the friezes and inscriptions of the monument as soon as the stone of the upper parts of the monument was in place. On the main frieze, he carved the names of the states and the wreathes in place. He probably roughed out the garlands and eagles of the attic frieze in the workshop.

Bairstow also carved the letters on the interior of the monument. This included the text by Royal Cortissoz of the New York Herald Tribune which is carved above the large central statue by Daniel Chester French: "In this temple, as in the hearts of the people for whom he saved the Union, the memory of Abraham Lincoln is enshrined forever."

Bairstow also carved the Gettysburg Address (1863) and Abraham Lincoln's second inaugural address (1865) on the walls on either side of the statue.

== Sources ==
- "Bairstow Eagle Lampposts (ca. 1906) at the Taft Bridge in Washington, D.C." dcMemorials.com. Archived from the original on 4 March 2016.
- Cauchon, Barry (20 March 2009). "The Lincoln Memorial: Construction & Dedication Photographs".
- "Certified Copy of an Entry of Birth" (Governmental Certificate). General Register Office of England. 5 May 1876. Volume 9B, page 226, line 115.
- DeFerrari, John (26 January 2011). "Lost Washington: The Gayety Theater". Greater Greater Washington.
- "District of Columbia, Glenwood Cemetery Records, 1854-2013". 15 September 1962 – via FamilySearch.
- Guthrie, Bruce (2014). "DC -- John A. Wilson Building -- Notes". Archived from the original on 4 March 2016.
- Hoagland, Alison K. (24 June 1983). "District Building, Southeast corner of 14th and E Streets, NW" (PDF). Historic American Buildings Survey, National Park Service, Department of the Interior.
- Lebovich, Bill (15 May 1987). "William H. Taft Memorial Bridge" (PDF). Historical American Engineering Record. Archived from the original (PDF) on 20 October 2012.
- Thomas, Christopher A. (2002). The Lincoln Memorial & American Life. Princeton University Press. p. 116. ISBN 0-691-01194-X.
- "U.S. General Services Administration Building, Washington, DC". U.S. General Services Administration. Archived from the original on 28 July 2010.
