= John B. Catoe Jr. =

Catoe Jr., John B.
Personal information
- Born: Washington, DC
- Occupation: General Manager

Sport

John B. Catoe, Jr. is the former general manager of Washington Metropolitan Area Transit Authority from 2007 to 2010. He was sworn in on January 27, 2007, replacing Jack Requa, the acting General Manager. Catoe was born and raised in a low-income area of Washington, D.C., and spent the majority of his childhood in the city, graduating from Spingarn High School. In his early 20s he moved to Southern California where he received his Bachelor of Science degree from the University of Redlands, Redlands. California. He currently resides in Santa Monica, California.

== Career ==
For over three decades John B. Catoe, Jr. has contributed greatly to the extension and enhancement of public transportation offerings throughout the U.S.

Named Outstanding Public Transportation Manager in 2009 by the American Public Transportation Association (APTA), Catoe made national headlines for orchestrating and executing safe, efficient, and reliable public transportation offerings to and from the 56th presidential inauguration events. Then serving as the General Manager for the Washington Metropolitan Area Transit Authority (WMATA), Catoe heeded President Obama’s call to make these events the most open and accessible in history, opening METRO services to include 23 special rapid bus corridors and extended rush hour service running for 17 continuous hours.

Catoe served as the general manager for WMATA from 2007 through 2010, holding oversight of a $2 billion budget and more than ten thousand employees. During his tenure, he developed plans and secured funding for capital improvements to infrastructure. Prior to his post at WMATA, Catoe served as the Deputy Chief Executive Officer for the Los Angeles County Metropolitan Transportation Authority (Metro) from 2001 through 2007.

While serving as the Director for the City of Santa Monica’s Big Blue Bus, Catoe expanded services by 40 percent and improved ridership by 36 percent. Under his leadership, the agency received the Los Angeles County Transportation Commission’s Metro Award for Efficiency, as well as APTA’s Outstanding Safety Award and two Outstanding Achievement Awards.

From 1979 through 1995, Catoe worked for the Orange County Transportation Authority (OCTA). While serving as the Agency’s Director of Transit Services, he managed the consolidation of the former transit district into the newly created authority.

Catoe's contract with Metro was renewed through 2012, with all but one board member voting in favor of the renewal.

On January 14, 2010, Catoe announced his resignation from Metro, effective April 2, 2010. His resignation came the year after the June 22, 2009 Washington Metro train collision, which killed nine people.

Civic offices
Preceded by Dan Tangherlini	WMATA General Manager; 2006	Succeeded by Richard Sarles
