= Edmund F. Mansure =

American businessman

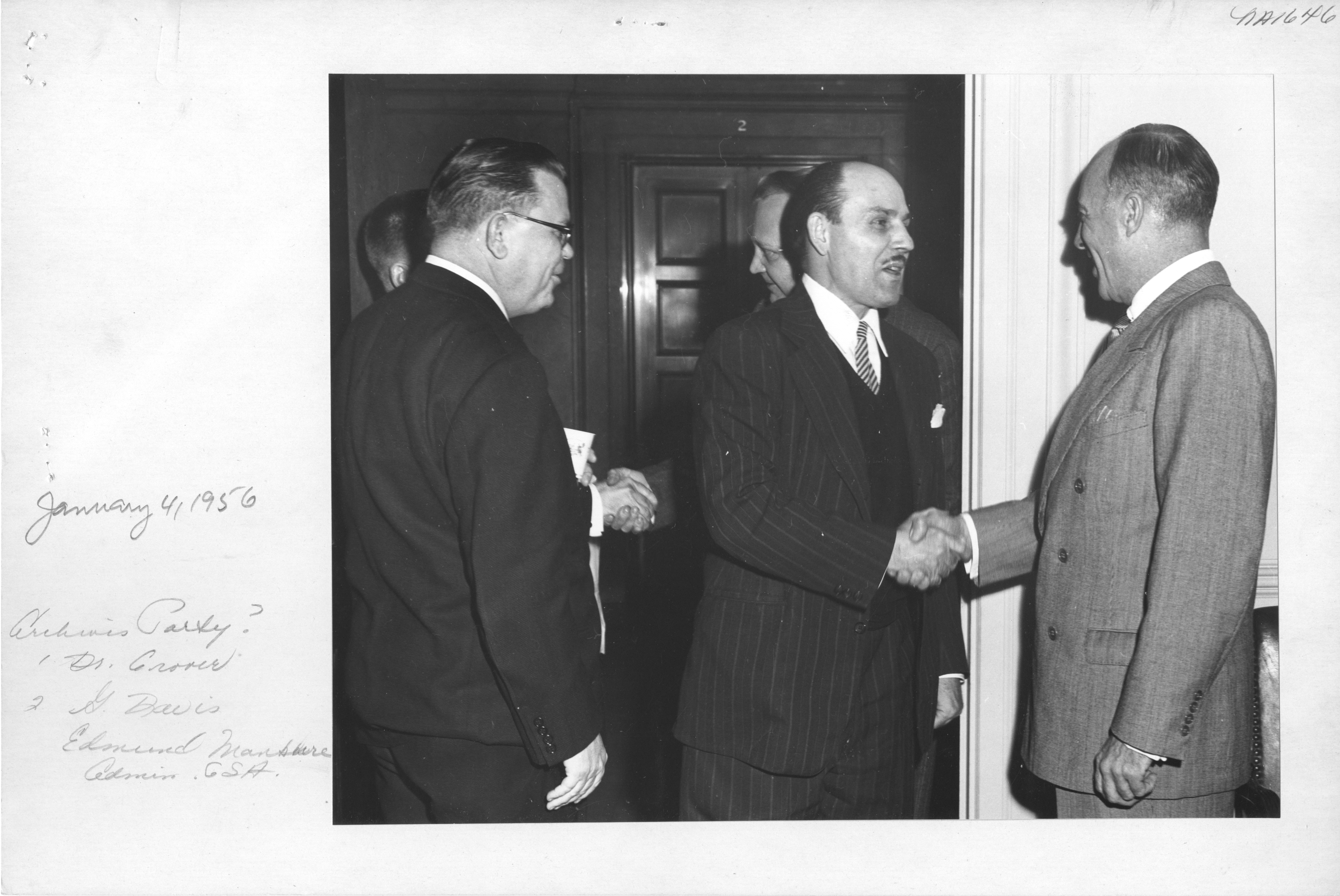
- Edmund F. Mansure (right)

2nd Administrator of the General Services Administration
- In office May 2, 1953 – February 29, 1956
- President: Dwight D. Eisenhower
- Preceded by: Jess Larson
- Succeeded by: Franklin G. Floete

Personal details
- Born: March 14, 1901; Chicago, Illinois
- Died: January 25, 1992 (aged 90); Menlo Park, California
- Political party: Republican

Edmund F. Mansure (March 14, 1901 – January 25, 1992) was an American businessman who served as Administrator of the General Services Administration from 1953 to 1956.

He died of Alzheimer's disease on January 25, 1992, in Menlo Park, California at age 90.
