= Terence Golden =

American businessman

13th Administrator of the General Services Administration
- In office June 29, 1985 – March 18, 1988
- President: Ronald Reagan
- Preceded by: Dwight Ink
- Succeeded by: Paul Trause

Personal details
- Party: Republican
- Education: University of Notre Dame (BA); Massachusetts Institute of Technology (MS); Harvard Business School (MBA)

Terence Cashin Golden is an American businessman who served as Administrator of the General Services Administration from 1985 to 1988.
