= Federal Research Division =

Unit within the US Library of Congress

The Federal Research Division (FRD) is the research and analysis unit of the United States Library of Congress.

The Federal Research Division provides directed research and analysis on domestic and international subjects to agencies of the United States government, the District of Columbia, and authorized federal contractors. As expert users of the vast English and foreign-language collections of the Library of Congress, the Division's area and subject specialists employ the resources of the world's largest library and other information sources worldwide to produce impartial and comprehensive studies on a cost-recovery basis.

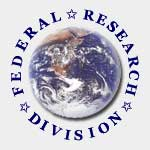
Logo of the Federal Research Division

The Federal Research Program is run by the Federal Research Division (FRD), the fee-for-service research and analysis unit within the Library of Congress. The Federal Research Program of the Library of Congress was authorized by the United States Congress in accordance with the Library of Congress Fiscal Operations Improvement Act of 2000 (2 U.S.C. 182c). Since 1948, FRD has operated on a "cost-recovery" funding (revolving funds), providing "high-quality" and custom products to the entities of the Federal government of the United States. Through the Federal Acquisition Regulations (FAR 51.1) and a comprehensive services agreement with the U.S. National Technical Information Service External Link, the FRD provides services to authorized federal contractors, the private sector, state and local government, international organizations, and others.

== Mission ==
The Federal Research Division's (FRD) "mandate is to support federal missions with outstanding and unbiased research" in direct support of its mission: "provides directed research, analysis, and translation services on domestic and international subjects to agencies of the U.S. government, the District of Columbia, and authorized federal contractors."

== History ==
Year	Names and Locations
1948	Established as Air Research Unit in Annex (John Adams Building); renamed Air Research Division.
1949	Renamed Air Studies Division
1963	Renamed Defense Research Division
1967	Moved to 214 Massachusetts Ave. NE
1970	Renamed Federal Research Division
1982	Moved to Washington Navy Yard
1994	Moved to Buzzard Point Annex
1996	Returned to Adams Building

FRD Division Chiefs	Years Served
John F. Stearns	1940s
William T. Walsh	1951-71
William R. Dodge	1971-80
Earl Rothermel	1980-86
Louis Mortimer	1991-97
Robert L. Worden	1998-2007
David Osborne	2007-13
Mukta Ohri	2015-17
Kristian Hassinger	2017-21
Anna K. Rorem	2021-Present

**Please refer to citation for location of information**

== Address ==
The Federal Research Division (FRD) is located on the fifth floor of the John Adams Building in Washington, D.C.; the physical address is 101 Independence Ave SE, John Adams Building, LA 5281, Washington, D.C. 20540-4840.

Contact number: 202-707-3900

== Products ==
- Primary research material including document delivery
- Foreign-language abstracting and translation
- Annotated bibliographies
- Organizational and legislative histories
- Studies and reports
- Books, such as the Country Studies series

== Services ==
- Research and analysis
- Writing and editing
- Publishing

== See also ==
- Congressional Research Service
