= Raymond Adam Kline =

American government official (1926–2010)

Raymond Adam Kline (September 14, 1926 – April 14, 2010) was a leading public administration practitioner. Kline was the former President of the National Academy of Public Administration; former Deputy and Acting Administrator, General Services Administration (GSA); and former Associate Administrator, Management Operations, NASA.

== Early years ==
Kline was born in the town of New Ringgold, Pennsylvania to Rev. Raymond Adam Kline and Marie (Herb). He, and his three sisters, were raised by their mother after their father died in 1936 from respiratory complications brought on by mustard gas exposure in World War I. Economic circumstances after Rev. Kline's death compelled the family to move to the Lutheran Orphans Home in Topton, PA. Kline, along with his mother Marie and three sisters, Helen, Marguerite and Yvonne, lived for two years at the orphanage from 1938 to 1940. Kline attended Lebanon High School in Lebanon, Pennsylvania from 1941 to 1944 where he was actively involved in academic clubs and sports. After graduating high school, Kline attended the Virginia Military Institute in the Army Specialized Training Program in 1944. He then volunteered in the U.S. Army during World War II, serving in active duty as Staff Sergeant and platoon leader, 1st Division, 26th Infantry Regiment in the European theater from 1944 to 1946. While in Germany, he stood guard at the Nuremberg trials of Nazi war criminals. Kline attended Lebanon Valley College from 1946 to 1950 on the G.I. Bill and graduated with an A.B. degree in political science (Pi Gamma Mu). Kline was later recalled to the U.S. Army during the Korean War and served in the Military Police Corps from 1950 to 1951. After his years in military service, Kline took on various jobs including working as a police officer in Ocean City, Maryland. Kline attended George Washington University School of Public Administration at night from 1952 to 1954 and fell short of his master's degree when he learned that his thesis topic had already been taken. His work and law school superseded efforts to complete the thesis. From 1954 to 1957, Kline attended George Washington University Law School and graduated with an LL.B. degree (Phi Delta Phi). The law degree fulfilled a promise that Kline made to his father just prior to his death. Kline was admitted to the Bar of the District of Columbia in 1958. In 1959, he was admitted to Federal Bar Association. He later received Honorary Doctor of Laws degrees from both George Washington University (1982) and Lebanon Valley College (1990).

== Career ==
Kline enjoyed a long career in public service in Washington, D.C.. His career began at the U.S. Navy Bureau of Ships from 1952 to 1956. After studying law in Washington, D.C., he moved to Huntsville, Alabama where he was employed by the Army Missile Command (Redstone Arsenal). Kline became a Management Analyst at Army Missile Command in 1958. While in Huntsville, he taught Political Science at the University of Alabama 1958–1963. He was recruited by NASA to serve as principal staff advisor to Dr. Wernher von Braun in the Executive Staff for the Management Development office during the Apollo era at the newly formed George C. Marshall Space Flight Center in Huntsville from 1962 to 1968. During the time of the first United States crewed missions in space, Kline served, among other duties, as von Braun's congressional speech writer. A notable speech included the often repeated phrase "the moon is our Paris," written for the Fourth National Conference on the Peaceful Uses of Space in 1964. Kline maintained several close ties with the astronauts and staff involved in the early Moon missions. Kline moved back to the Maryland suburbs of Washington, DC in a new capacity at NASA as the Associate Administrator for Management Operations from 1968 to 1979. Kline remained involved with space exploration and crewed space missions, which became a lifelong passion.

After his tenure at NASA, Kline took the job of Deputy Administrator at GSA from 1979 to 1985 and was GSA's Acting Administrator 1981, 1984–1985. In 1982, Kline was awarded the Presidential rank of Distinguished Senior Executive by President Reagan. As Acting Administrator of GSA, Kline worked to restore independence of the National Archives from GSA and directly contributed to passage of the National Archives and Records Administration Act of 1984. After his retirement in 1985 from public service after 33 years in the Federal government, Kline became President of the National Academy of Public Administration (NAPA), a non-partisan, nonprofit corporation established in 1967 and chartered by Congress to provide research and counsel to increase the effectiveness of American government at all levels. Kline served as NAPA's president from 1985 to 1992. During this time at NAPA, Kline appeared before several congressional committees to provide testimony on various topics. Since retirement in 1992, Kline was voted onto the board of the Kerr Foundation, a non-profit charitable and educational organization in Oklahoma, where he served until 2009. Kline also served on other boards including the Procurement Round Table and the Roger W. Jones Award for Executive Leadership at American University. Kline also holds the top awards from three federal agencies: the NASA Distinguished Service Medal, the GSA Distinguished Service Award and theArchivists' Distinguished Service Award from the National Archives and Records Administration.

== Personal life ==
After retiring in 1992, Kline remained in the Maryland suburbs of Washington, D.C., serving on several advisory boards. He enjoyed his family, travel, and various intellectual pursuits. Kline married Jeanelle Batley April 26, 1958, and they had two children: Robin Jeanelle (b. 1962) Raymond Ashley (b. 1969).
