= Martha N. Johnson =

American government official

Martha Johnson
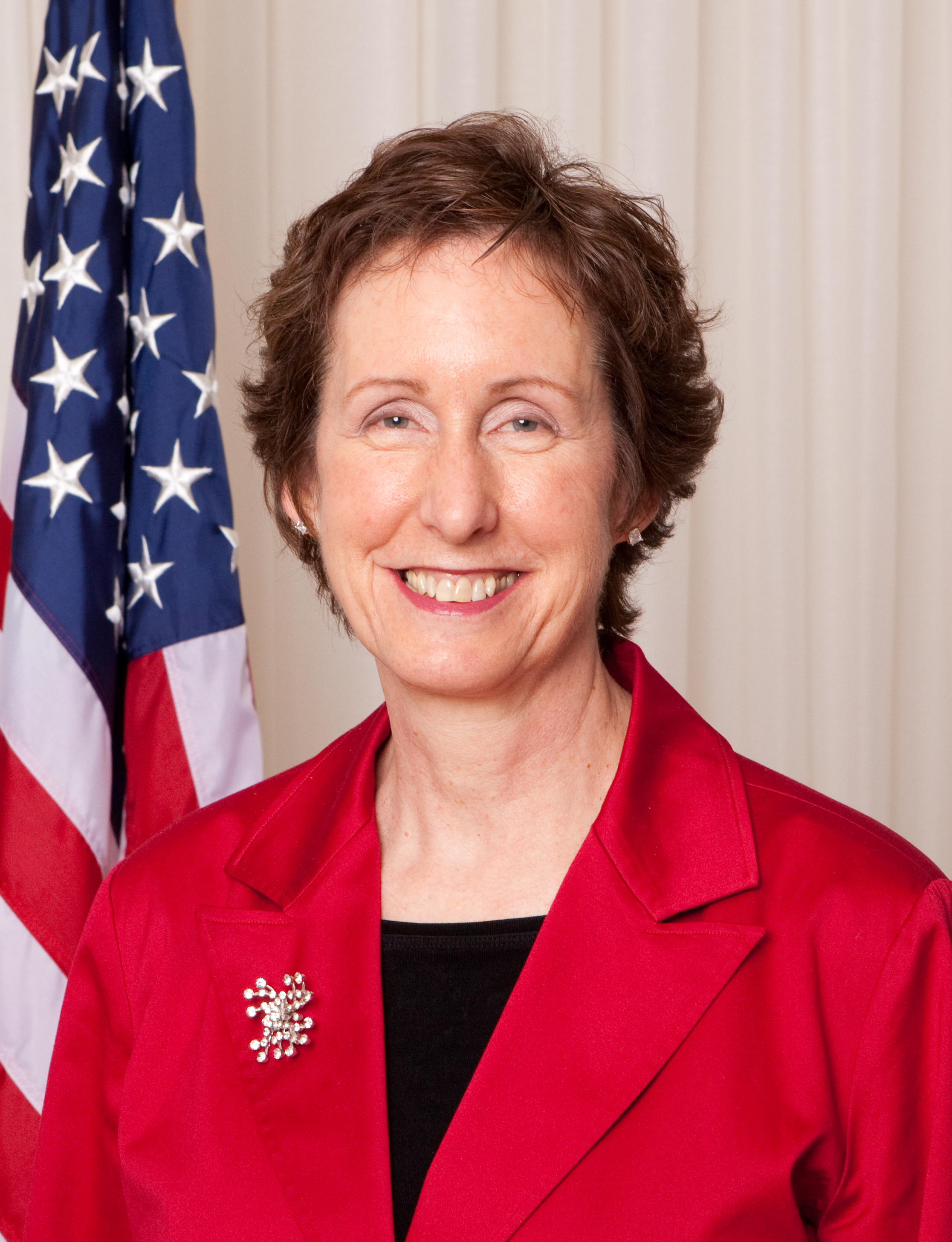
- Johnson in 2010

Administrator of General Services
- In office February 16, 2010 – April 2, 2012
- President: Barack Obama
- Deputy: Susan Brita
- Preceded by: Stephen Leeds (Acting)
- Succeeded by: Dan Tangherlini (Acting)

Personal details
- Born: 1952 (age 73–74) New Haven, Connecticut, U.S.
- Party: Democratic
- Education: Oberlin College (BA); Yale University (MBA)

Martha N. Johnson (born 1952) is an American human resources executive and government official who served as Administrator of General Services from 2010 to 2012. Johnson resigned on April 2, 2012, following a scathing Inspector General report that revealed a "gross misuse of taxpayer dollars" on an internal conference that was "excessive, wasteful, and in some cases impermissible."

== Early life and education ==
Born in New Haven, Connecticut, Johnson earned a bachelor's degree in economics and history from Oberlin College in 1974. She then earned an MBA degree from the Yale School of Organization and Management.

== Career ==
From 1979 until 1985, Johnson worked as a manager for Cummins Engine Company, first in Columbus, Indiana, and then in Jamestown, New York. She worked from 1985 until 1987 as the CFO for an architecture firm, in 1987 and 1988 as a recruiter for a staffing company, and from 1988 until 1992 as a consultant in a diversity consulting firm. During 1992, she was an executive recruiting consultant with Ben & Jerry's for several months.

After working on the Clinton-Gore transition team, Johnson worked in the White House Office's Office of Presidential Personnel until October 1993, and then served as an Associate Deputy Secretary of Commerce from 1993 until 1996. In March 1996, Johnson joined the General Services Administration, working there as a chief of staff from 1996 until January 20, 2001.

In November 2001, Johnson became vice president of the Council for Excellence in Government. In January 2003, she left the Council for Excellence in Government to become a director at Touchstone Consulting Group, which was purchased by SRA International in 2005. SRA then employed Johnson from March 2005 until November 2007. In late 2008, Johnson became a co-leader of the Obama transition team evaluating the GSA.

Johnson left SRA to become a vice president of culture at Computer Sciences Corporation, a role she held until February 2010. In April 2009, President Barack Obama nominated Johnson to serve as the Administrator of the GSA. On June 8, 2009, Johnson's nomination was reported by United States Senate Committee on Homeland Security and Governmental Affairs.

Johnson's nomination was delayed for months after Missouri Sen. Kit Bond placed a hold on her nomination over concerns he had about why the GSA wasn't closing down the federally owned Bannister Complex outside Kansas City, Missouri and relocating staff to leased space in downtown Kansas City. On January 28, 2010, Senate Majority Leader Harry Reid filed for cloture on Johnson's nomination. President Obama sharply criticized Bond and Republican senators for blocking Johnson's nomination, and complained that Republicans were blocking nominees for reasons that have nothing to do with their qualifications for their prospective jobs. While at a retreat for Democratic senators, Obama made the comments in response to a question from Sen. Patrick Leahy about his judicial nominations. Obama expanded his answer to include not just blocked judicial nominations but also executive nominations as well:

Nobody can tell me that there's anything particularly wrong with her. They're blocking her because of some unrelated matter. Don't hold this — this woman hostage. If you have an objection about my health-care policies, then let's debate the health-care policies. But don't suddenly end up having a GSA administrator who is stuck in limbo somewhere because you don't like something else that we're doing.

— Barack Obama

The full U.S. Senate voted 82-16 for cloture on Johnson's nomination on February 4, 2010. Immediately afterward, the Senate voted 94-2 (with four abstentions) to confirm Johnson. Subsequent to the vote, the two senators voting against Johnson, Jim Bunning and Jeff Sessions, asked to change their votes to "yea," making the confirmation vote 96-0.

=== Bannister Complex controversy ===
In a letter to Martha Johnson dated November 30, 2010, Missouri Senators Kit Bond and Claire McCaskill and Representative Emanuel Cleaver assert that GSA Public Buildings Service employees failed to ensure and maintain a safe working environment for employees and tenants at the Bannister Federal Complex in Kansas City, Missouri. The letter directed Martha Johnson to take the appropriate steps to identify those responsible for the lax safety culture at the Bannister complex and take the appropriate steps to hold those individuals accountable.

The letter came after three weeks of phone calls and e-mails from NBC Action News in Kansas City to GSA media contacts. Despite numerous requests from NBC Action News for an interview with Martha Johnson regarding the health concerns at the Bannister complex, Johnson failed to respond to the requests for interviews. A Freedom of Information Act (FOIA) request turned up documents that indicated senior GSA officials knew of the health concerns, including a list of more than 100 sick and dead former employees of the complex; however, senior GSA officials originally denied knowledge of the information. Emails later obtained by NBC Action News proved that high level Public Buildings Service officials had actually obtained the list of sick and dead former employees three months before the NBC investigation began. In a later FOIA request from NBC Action News, GSA also withheld a letter from the Missouri Department of Natural Resources that was critical of the GSA's investigation into contamination near a day care center at the Bannister complex. After weeks of requests for interviews, Martha Johnson failed to comment on the situation regarding GSA's withholding of information or the subsequent Inspector General report that indicated GSA officials misled employees about health concerns at the Bannister Complex.

Additional investigations revealed that GSA paid $234,000 to a Kansas City public relations firm to manage negative publicity that GSA was receiving as a result of mismanagement of the investigations into the Bannister complex. As a result, Senator Claire McCaskill announced that she would launch an investigation into the use of tax dollars used by federal agencies to hire public relations consultants to "spin" their images. In a November 2010 letter to Martha Johnson, Senator McCaskill reminded GSA that "publicity experts" cannot engage in "publicity and propaganda" unless authorized by Congress and requested a detailed report of the government's use of these services.

=== Resignation ===
Johnson resigned after firing two of her top deputies on April 2, 2012, amid reports of excessive spending at a training conference at the luxury M Resort spa and casino near Las Vegas in October 2010. Four Regional Commissioners involved in organizing the four-day conference were also placed on administrative leave pending further action. The report revealed that the GSA spent $822,000 for 300 people to attend the training conference. The expenses included $147,000 in airfare and lodging at the hotel for six planning trips by a team of organizers. Among the other expenses were $3,200 for a mind reader; $6,300 on commemorative Recovery Act coin sets displayed in velvet boxes, $6,000 on canteens, keychains, T-shirts, and $75,000 on a team building exercise to build a bicycle. Additional controversial costs included $1,840 for vests for 19 "regional ambassadors" and other employees, and $393.90 for tuxedo rental for three employees who acted as masters of ceremonies at an awards dinner that cost $30,207.60. High ranking GSA officials also hosted several semi-private parties in their own hotel rooms or suites, which were catered at taxpayer expense. White House Chief of Staff Jacob J. Lew said that President Obama "was outraged by the excessive spending, questionable dealings with contractors, and disregard for taxpayer dollars," and that he "called for all those responsible to be held fully accountable." The White House named Dan Tangherlini to head the GSA following Johnson's resignation.

F. Joseph Moravec, commissioner of GSA's Public Buildings Service during the George W. Bush administration, complained that the scandal fallout had unfairly tarnished Johnson, illustrating "why people with good reputations don't want to work in government." According to Moravec, Johnson's resignation "reflects wonderfully on her character" since she apparently had "not done anything wrong." Moravec continued, "Political appointees are there to serve not only their country but the president, so resigning is the correct and honorable thing to do if the president is extremely displeased."

=== Later career ===
After resigning from GSA, Johnson self-published a novel, In Our Midst, and wrote a nonfiction book, On My Watch, which has been described as "part autobiography and part leadership guide."

Political offices
| Preceded by Stephen Leeds; Acting | Administrator of General Services; 2009–2012 | Succeeded by Dan Tangherlini; Acting |
