= United States General Services Administration Building =

Office building in Washington, D.C.

- Interior Department Offices
- U.S. National Register of Historic Places
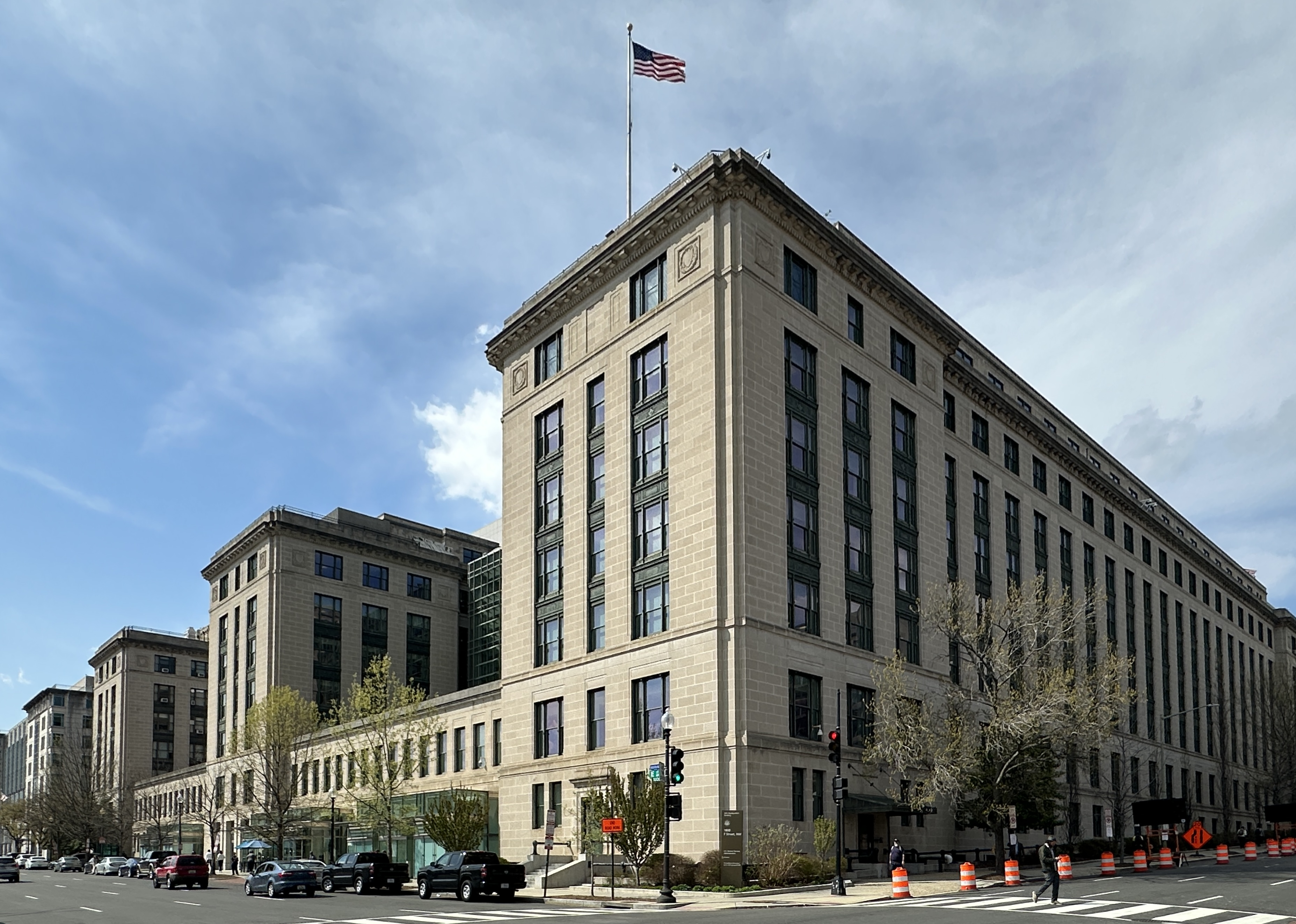
- U.S. General Services Administration Building in 2026

- Location within Central Washington, D.C. Location within the District of Columbia Location within the United States
- Location: Eighteenth and F Sts. NW, Washington, D.C.
- Coordinates: 38°53′48″N 77°2′35″W
- Area: 3.6 acres (1.5 ha)
- Built: 1917
- Architect: Charles Butler; Office of the Supervising Architect
- Architectural style: Classical Revival, Beaux Arts
- NRHP reference No.: 86003160
- Added to NRHP: November 23, 1986

The U.S. General Services Administration Building is a historic office building and the headquarters of General Services Administration (GSA) located at 1800 F Street Northwest in Washington, D.C. Designed by Charles Butler in the neoclassical style, it was built between 1915 and 1917 and originally housed offices of the United States Department of the Interior. The building has a facade of Indiana limestone, with an E-shaped plan allowing for open courtyards, and a carved stone eagle and limestone panels designed by Ernest C. Bairstow. An oak-paneled Administrator's Suite is inside.

In 1935, the building underwent alterations with the construction of a seventh floor and the installation of air-conditioning. The Department of the Interior departed between 1937 and 1939, and the Federal Works Administration became the primary tenant. The GSA was established in 1949, absorbing the activities and offices of the Federal Works Administration. The building was listed in the National Register of Historic Places in 1976, and a renovation took place between 1999 and 2002.

== History ==
The U.S. General Services Administration Building, originally designed for the U.S. Department of the Interior, was the first truly modern office building constructed by the U.S. Government and served as a model for federal offices through the early 1930s.

New York architect Charles Butler (1871–1953) designed the innovative building in his capacity as consultant to the Office of the Supervising Architect under Oscar Wenderoth. Butler's design, patterned after private office buildings in New York and Washington, DC, allowed for the substantial amount of natural light necessary for the many architects, draftsmen, pressmen, and scientists working in the building. Construction of the restrained Neo-Classical building began in 1915 and was completed in 1917 at a cost of $2,703,494.

The Department of the Interior occupied the building from 1917 until 1937, a period significant in the department's history. The activities of the National Park Service were conceived in the sixth floor offices of Interior Secretary Franklin K. Lane. The U.S. Geological Survey, the largest tenant in the building, determined which public lands would be closed to development and conserved for their mineral and water resources. In 1921–1922 the building was the locus of the "Teapot Dome" scandal involving Secretary of the Interior Albert Fall. Harold L. Ickes, Secretary of the Interior under Presidents Franklin D. Roosevelt and Harry Truman, oversaw construction of dams, fully developed the National Park Service to provide recreational needs, and served as the first Federal Administrator of Public Works. They moved to the Main Interior Building.

In 1939, the Works Progress Administration (WPA) became the building's primary occupant. PWA activities were subsumed into the newly created U.S. General Services Administration (GSA) in 1949 and the building was renamed the U.S. General Services Administration Building. In 1986 the building was listed in the National Register of Historic Places. Funding from the American Recovery and Reinvestment Act of 2009 allowed the construction of glassy, energy-efficient new infill space in the GSA building's East courtyard, and the modernization of half of the rest of the building. This new space, and an open floorplan, allowed employees from previously leased buildings in Crystal City and elsewhere to be moved into this historic building, which saves lease costs and serves as an example for other federal agencies. It continues to house GSA including the Public Buildings Service.

When the second presidency of Donald Trump began in 2025, Trump directed the GSA to create a list of properties to be sold through the accelerated disposition process. As part of a list released that March, the GSA listed its own headquarters as one of the properties to be sold via accelerated disposition. The GSA requested $240 million of congressional funds in November 2025 for a renovation of the building. That December, in an unrelated lawsuit involving the Eisenhower Executive Office Building, a former GSA official testified the Trump administration was considering demolishing the GSA Building without receiving requisite approval from the GSA, though Trump administration officials denied the allegations.

== Architecture ==
The U.S. General Services Administration Building, the first government building designed for the specific needs of a designated federal department, was the first federal building to use limestone facing and one of the first buildings in Washington, DC constructed of steel framing. It fills the entire city block between E, F, Eighteenth and Nineteenth Streets.

The site was thought by some Congressional representatives to be a poor location for a major federal building due to its distance from Capitol Hill. One Congressman stated in 1913, "Every time we build one of these buildings, we get them farther and farther out, after a while they will go to the city limits...it is not a good business policy to scatter these buildings everywhere.

The building was designed in an "E-shaped" configuration, creating open courtyards that provided maximum exposure to natural light and cooling breezes for all offices. This design resulted in glass covering fifty percent of the total wall surface on the street elevations and seventy percent of the total wall surface on the courtyard elevations. The facade was originally to have been built of brick, but substantial cost-savings measures undertaken during construction permitted the use of Indiana limestone for all of the building's exterior.

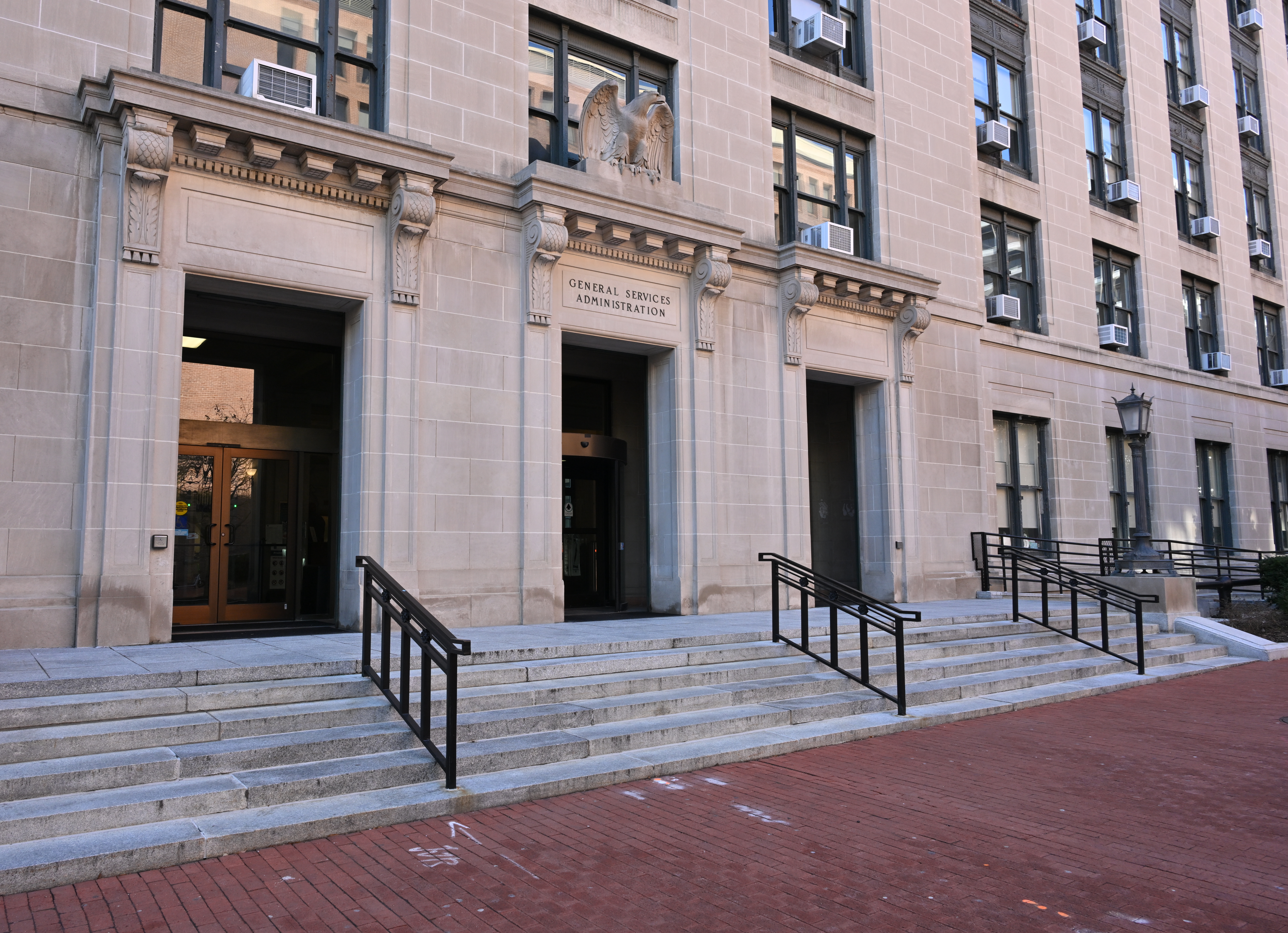
GSA Headquarters Building main entrance

A large building, its exterior is presented without undue ornamentation. The major exterior decorative element is the centrally located F Street entrance. Pilasters and a modillioned cornice frame each of the three entry doors on the F Street facade. An eagle carved by Ernest C. Bairstow, a decorative sculptor from Washington, DC, is located over the central opening. Bairstow also provided the designs for the twenty-eight limestone panels in the frieze at the sixth story and the ornamental work on the F Street entrances. The entrance at the southern end of Eighteenth Street is sheltered by an iron and glass marquee overhanging the granite steps and part of a semi-circular driveway. This unusual entrance treatment was designed originally as a private entrance for the Secretary of the Interior, whose suite of offices was directly above on the sixth floor.

This suite on the sixth floor, now used by the GSA Administrator, is the most elaborate space in the building. It includes a private office, a private passage, and a private restroom complete with full bath, as well as a public reception room. Distinguished decorative features in the Administrator's Suite include English oak floor-to-ceiling panels and a relief plaster ceiling. The fireplace of carved French limestone is one of the few working fireplaces remaining in a Federal building in the United States. Beyond this suite, other interior amenities included iced drinking water in the halls, washbasins in each office, and an auditorium, the first such space in a Federal building.

A series of improvements have been made to office spaces to meet the evolving needs of the U.S. Department of Interior, Federal Works Administration, and U.S. General Services Administration. In the 1930s a seventh-floor addition was constructed on the roof and air-conditioning was installed throughout the building. Where necessary, extensive remodeling of original corridors was undertaken.

In 1999 the U.S. General Services Administration initiated a demonstration "First Impressions" project in the lobby and on the building's exterior. The goal of the "First Impressions" program is to change the way people perceive Federal buildings. Initiatives included restoring windows, cleaning exterior masonry, returning public corridors to original paint colors, replicating original corridor lighting, and creating model office space for the twenty-first century.

The US government's technology and design consultancy was named 18F, after the building address.

== Gallery ==
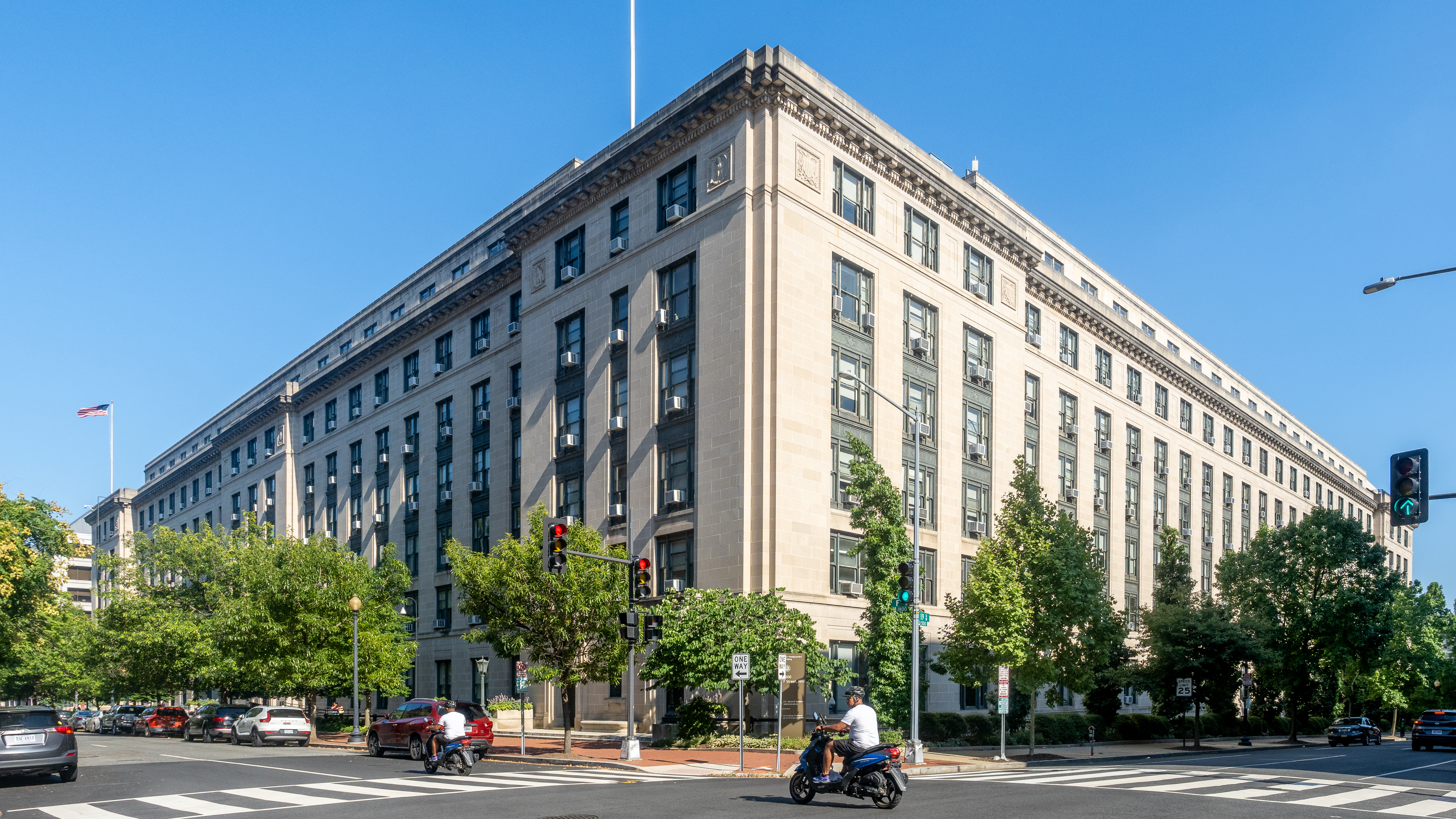
U.S. General Services Administration Building

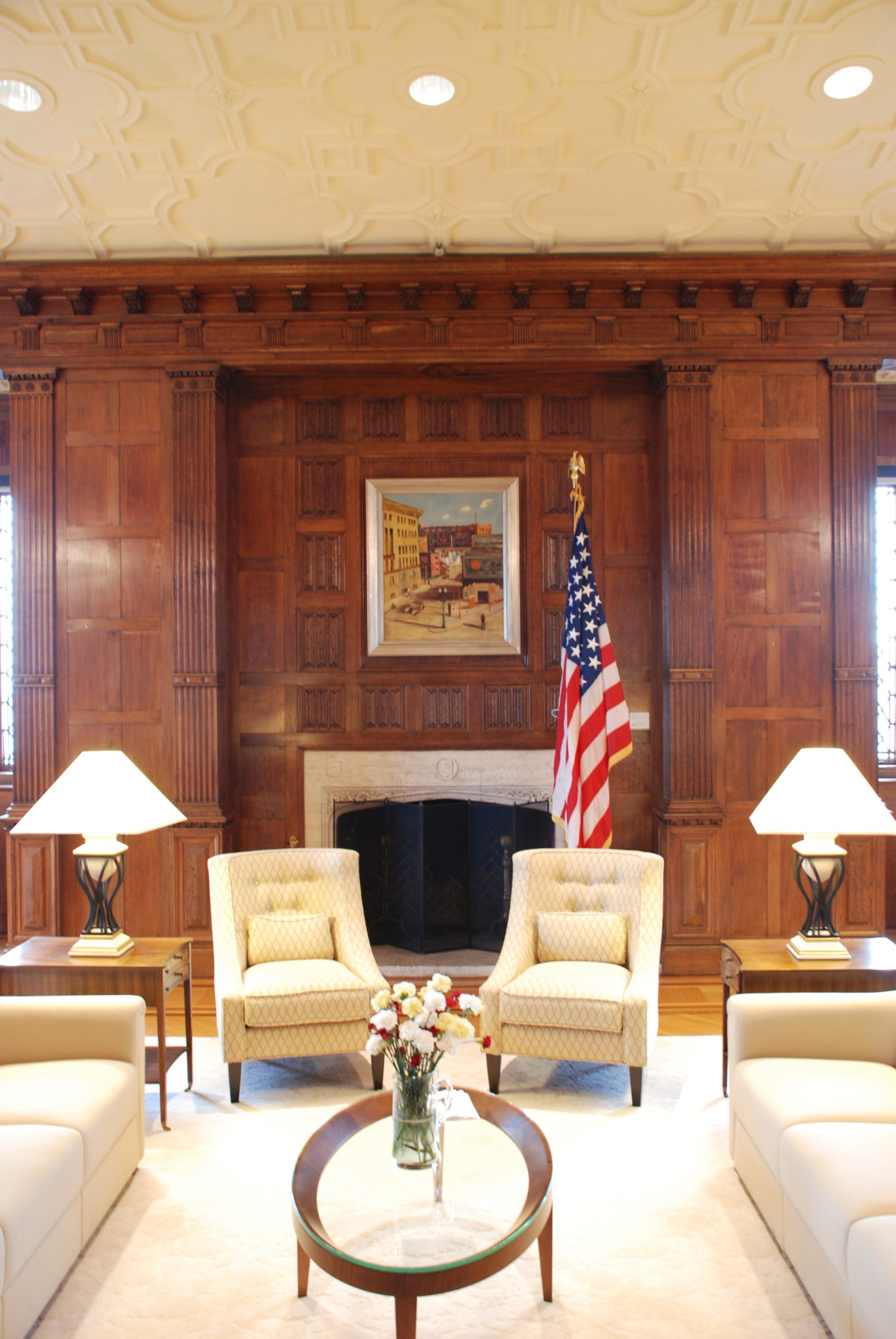
Administrator Suite

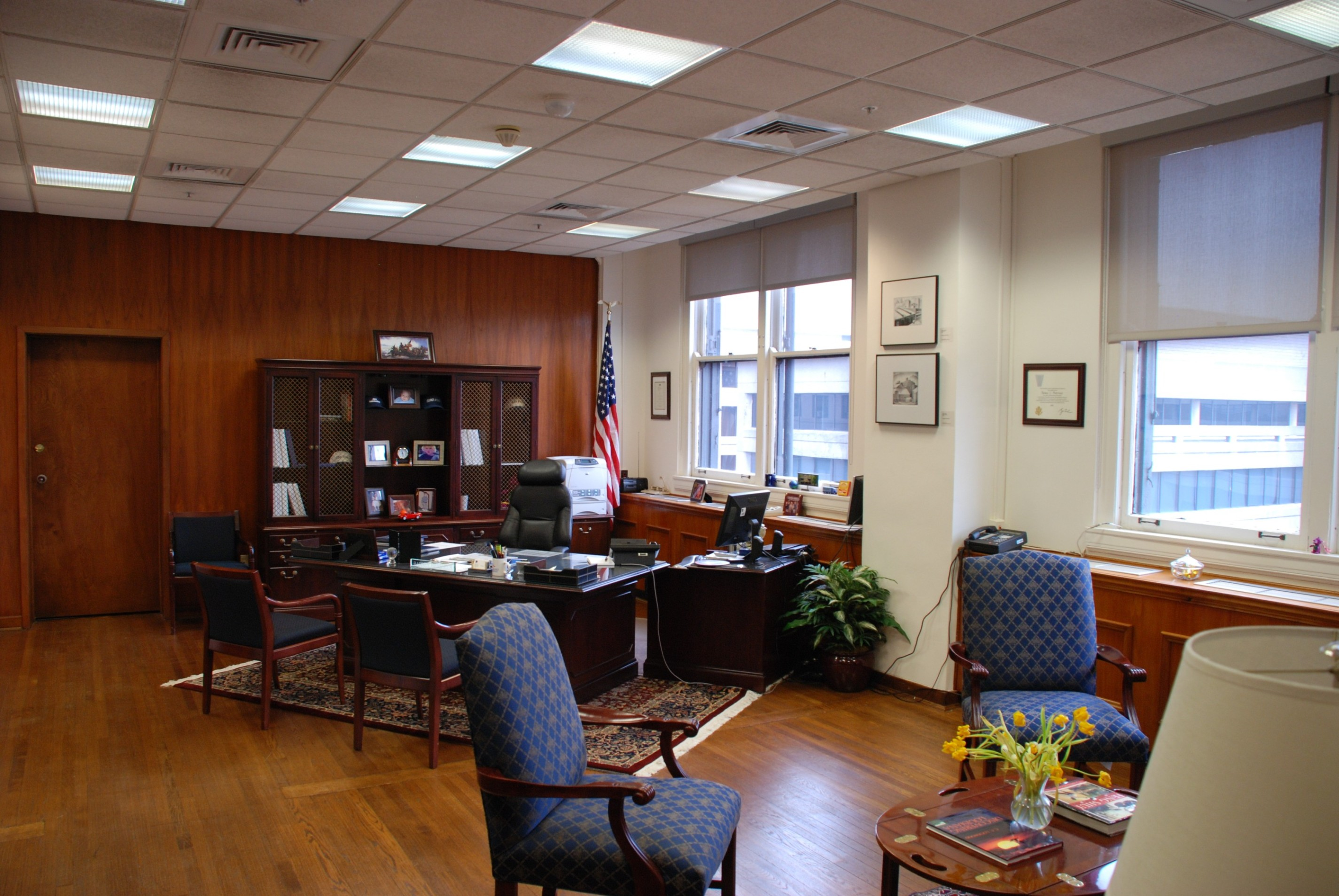
Administrator Suite

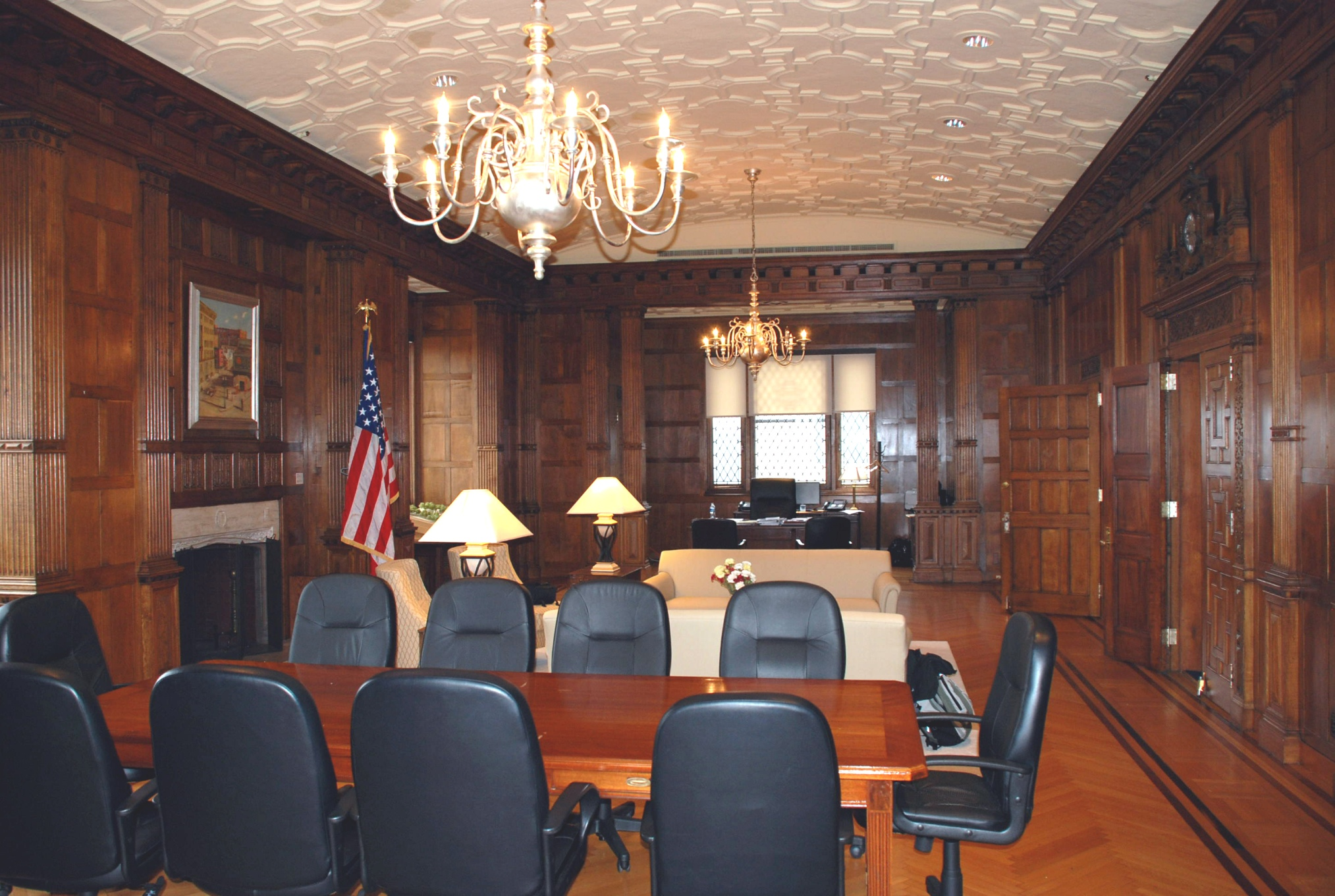
Administrator Suite

== See also ==
- National Register of Historic Places listings in central Washington, D.C.
