= General Services Administration =

U.S. government agency formed in 1949

- Seal of the General Services Administration

- Logo of the General Services Administration

- Flag of the General Services Administration

Agency overview
- Formed: July 1, 1949; 77 years ago
- Headquarters: GSA Building 1800 F Street NW, Washington, D.C., U.S.
- Employees: 12,000 (FY 2024)
- Annual budget: $61.1 billion (FY 2024)
- Agency executives: Edward Forst, administrator; Mike Lynch, deputy administrator
- Child agencies: Public Buildings Service; Federal Acquisition Service; Staff offices (12); Independent offices (2)
- Key document: Federal Property and Administrative Services Act of 1949
- Website: www.gsa.gov

The General Services Administration (GSA) is an independent agency of the United States government established in 1949 to help manage and support the basic functioning of federal agencies. The GSA supplies products and communications for U.S. government offices, provides transportation, office space, building services, and property management to federal employees, agencies, and develops government-wide cost-minimizing policies and other management tasks.

The GSA employs about 12,000 federal workers. It has an annual operating budget of roughly $33 billion and oversees $66 billion of procurement annually. It contributes to the management of about $500 billion in U.S. federal property, divided chiefly among 8,397 owned and leased buildings (with a total of 363 million square feet of space) as well as a 215,000-vehicle motor pool. Among the real estate assets it manages are the Ronald Reagan Building and International Trade Center in Washington, D.C., which is the largest U.S. federal building after the Pentagon.

The GSA's business lines include the Federal Acquisition Service (FAS) and the Public Buildings Service (PBS), as well as several Staff Offices including the Office of Government-wide Policy, the Office of Small Business Utilization, and the Office of Mission Assurance. As part of FAS, GSA's Technology Transformation Services (TTS) helps federal agencies improve the delivery of information and services to the public. Initiatives include the Presidential Innovation Fellows program, 18F, Login.gov, Cloud.gov, FedRAMP, the USAGov platform (USA.gov, GobiernoUSA.gov), Data.gov, Challenge.gov, the U.S. Web Design System, and I.T. Modernization Centers of Excellence.

The GSA is a member of the Procurement G6, an informal group leading the use of framework agreements and e-procurement instruments in public procurement.

== History ==
In 1947, President Harry Truman asked former president Herbert Hoover to lead what became known as the Hoover Commission to make recommendations to reorganize the operations of the federal government. One of the commission's recommendations was the establishment of an "Office of the General Services", to combine the responsibilities of the following organizations:

- United States Department of the Treasury's Bureau of Federal Supply
- U.S. Treasury Department's Office of Contract Settlement
- National Archives Establishment
- All functions of the Federal Works Agency, including the Public Buildings Administration and the Public Roads Administration
- War Assets Administration

GSA became an independent agency on July 1, 1949, after the passage of the Federal Property and Administrative Services Act. General Jess Larson, administrator of the War Assets Administration, was named GSA's first administrator.

The first job awaiting Administrator Larson and the newly formed GSA was a complete renovation of the White House. The structure had fallen into such a state of disrepair by 1949 that one inspector said it was standing "purely from habit". Larson later explained the total renovation in depth by saying, "In order to make the White House structurally sound, it was necessary to completely dismantle, and I mean completely dismantle, everything from the White House except the four walls, which were constructed of stone. Everything, except the four walls without a roof, was finally stripped down, and that's where the work started." GSA worked closely with President Truman and First Lady Bess Truman to ensure that the new agency's first major project would be a success. GSA completed the renovation in 1952.

In 1960, GSA created the Federal Telecommunications System, a government-wide intercity telephone system. In 1962, the Ad Hoc Committee on Federal Office Space created a new building program to address obsolete office buildings in Washington, D.C., resulting in the construction of many of the offices that now line Independence Avenue.

In 1970, the Nixon administration created the Consumer Product Information Coordinating Center, now part of USAGov. In 1974 the Federal Buildings Fund was initiated, allowing GSA to issue rent bills to federal agencies. In 1972 GSA established the Automated Data and Telecommunications Service, which later became the Office of Information Resources Management. In 1973 GSA created the Office of Federal Management Policy. GSA's Office of Acquisition Policy centralized procurement policy in 1978. GSA was initially responsible for emergency preparedness and stockpiling strategic materials to be used in wartime until those functions were transferred to the newly created Federal Emergency Management Agency in 1979.

In 1984, GSA introduced the federal government to the use of charge cards, known as the GSA SmartPay system. The National Archives and Records Administration was spun off into an independent agency in 1985. The same year, GSA began providing government-wide policy oversight and guidance for federal real property management as a result of an executive order signed by President Ronald Reagan.

In 1986, GSA headquarters, U.S. General Services Administration Building, located at Eighteenth and F Streets, NW, was listed on the National Register of Historic Places, at the time serving as Interior Department offices.

In 2003, the Federal Protective Service, which secures GSA-managed (and other) buildings, was moved to the United States Department of Homeland Security. In 2005, GSA reorganized to merge the Federal Supply Service (FSS) and Federal Technology Service (FTS) business lines into the Federal Acquisition Service (FAS).

On April 3, 2009, President Barack Obama nominated Martha N. Johnson to serve as GSA Administrator. After a nine-month delay, the United States Senate confirmed her nomination on February 4, 2010. On April 2, 2012, Johnson resigned in the wake of a management-deficiency report that detailed improper payments for a 2010 "Western Regions" training conference held by the Public Buildings Service in Las Vegas.

In 2013, a result of the Open Government Initiative's instruction for federal agencies to open their activities to the public, GSA developed Data.gov to foster transparency and information sharing. In the same year, GSA also launched the Total Workplace initiative to modernize the workplace of federal agencies and increase efficiency, alongside the Presidential Innovation Fellows and the 18F programs. In 2016, the Acquisition Gateway and Making It Easier programs were launched to assist buyers from federal agencies in acquisitions, and to assist new companies in doing business with the government. Improvements were also made in the deliverance of digital government services with the creation of the Technology Transformation Services.

After the election of President Donald Trump in January 2025, GSA became one of the US federal agencies targeted by Elon Musk. Members of the Department of Government Efficiency accessed GSA laptops and internal GSA infrastructure. An employee of Elon Musk's company Tesla, Thomas Shedd, was appointed to lead "Technology Transformation Services" within the GSA.

=== Controversies ===
==== Ted Weiss Federal Building controversy ====
In July 1991, GSA contractors began the excavation of what is now the Ted Weiss Federal Building in New York City. The planning for that building did not take into account the possibility of encountering the historic cemetery for colonial-era African New Yorkers located beneath the footprint of the $276 million office building. When initial excavation disturbed burials, destroying skeletons and artifacts, GSA sent archaeologists to excavate—but hid their findings from the public. Revelation of the discoveries led to 18 months of activism by African-descendant community members, public officials, academics, and concerned citizens. Ultimately, GSA made public amends by funding extensive scientific research under the auspices of Michael Blakey; creating a new subagency, the Office of Public Education and Interpretation; truncating the building plan; and funding public reports on the story of the African Burial Ground. The efforts led to the creation of a new unit of the National Park Service, the African Burial Ground National Monument, at the facility. GSA fully funded that portion of the National Park Service until 2010, when GSA's formal involvement with the African Burial Ground ceased.

==== Lurita Doan controversy ====
During President George W. Bush's Administration GSA Administrator, Lurita Doan, was forced to resign after GSA had awarded a sole source contract for $20,000 to her friend. Doan appeared to have violated the Hatch Act and was criticized for political activity while on the job. The investigating team recommended she be punished to the fullest extent, and she resigned soon after.

==== Western Regions Training Conference controversy ====
In 2012, U.S. representative John Mica, chairman of the House Transportation and Infrastructure Committee, called for a congressional investigation into the misuse of federal money by GSA. Lawmakers accused GSA of "lavish spending" following the 2010 Western Regions Training Conference at the M Resort in Las Vegas.

GSA spent $823,000 in taxpayer money toward the October 2010 convention, including $100,405.37 spent on employee travel costs for a total of eight pre-planning meetings, scouting trips, and a "dry run". The report also found excessive spending for event planners, gifts for participants, and lavish meals.

The conference had been the most recent in a series of similar lavish conferences organized by regions of GSA's Public Buildings Service (PBS, not to be confused with the public broadcaster of the same name). In May 2010 GSA treated 120 interns to a five-day conference at a Palm Springs, California, resort. An additional investigation led by Inspector General Brian D. Miller found 115 missing Apple iPods meant for an employee rewards program.

GSA administrator Martha N. Johnson resigned in the wake of the controversy, after firing Public Buildings Service head Robert Peck and senior advisor Stephen Leeds. Four regional commissioners of the Service, who had been responsible for planning the conference, were placed on administrative leave.

==== Trump–Biden presidential transition controversy ====
After Joe Biden was called by media outlets as the president-elect of the United States – defeating Donald Trump in the November 2020 election – Emily W. Murphy, the chief executive of the General Services Administration, initially refused to sign a letter authorizing Biden's transition team to begin work and access federal agencies and transition funds, according to The Washington Post. This came as Trump refused to concede Biden's presumptive – but not yet certified – victory and follow the norm of facilitating a peaceful transition of power to the presumptive winner. There are no firm rules on how the GSA determines the president-elect. Typically, the GSA chief might decide after reliable news organizations have declared the winner or following a concession by the loser. On November 23, 2020, Murphy issued the letter of ascertainment that meant the Trump administration was ready to begin the formal transition.

==== Login.gov Digital Identity Standards controversy ====
In April 2022, the Office of Inspector General (OIG), Office of Inspections, initiated an evaluation of the GSA's Login.gov services. OIG initiated this evaluation based on a notification received from GSA's Office of General Counsel identifying potential misconduct within Login.gov, a component of GSA's Technology Transformation Services (TTS) under the Federal Acquisition Service (FAS). OIG's evaluation found that GSA misled their customer agencies when GSA failed to communicate Login.gov's known noncompliance with the National Institute of Standards and Technology (NIST) Special Publication (SP) 800-63-3, Digital Identity Guidelines.

Notwithstanding GSA officials' assertions that Login.gov met SP 800-63-3 Identity Assurance Level 2 (IAL2) requirements, Login.gov has never included a physical or biometric comparison for its customer agencies. Further, GSA continued to mislead customer agencies even after GSA suspended efforts to meet SP 800-63-3. GSA knowingly billed IAL2 customer agencies over $10 million for services, including alleged IAL2 services that did not meet IAL2 standards. Furthermore, GSA used misleading language to secure additional funds for Login.gov. Finally, the GSA lacked adequate controls over the Login.gov program and allowed it to operate under a hands-off culture. OIG found that because of its failure to exercise management oversight and internal controls over Login.gov, FAS shares responsibility for the misrepresentations to GSA's customers. In response to OIG's report, GSA management agreed with the findings and recommendations.

==== Judiciary ====
In February 2026, the federal judiciary asked Congress to allow it to directly manage its facilities. The courts said:

The General Services Administration (GSA) has long served as the Judiciary's landlord. But over more than a decade, buildings that house the Judiciary have accumulated a growing backlog of $8.3 billion worth of critical repairs for basic courthouse systems, such as roofs, elevators, lighting, doors, and windows. Some emergency repairs, such as storm and water damage, can take years to complete.

== Organization ==
=== Structure ===
The administrator is a presidential political appointee and the chief executive of the General Services Administration. On April 12, 2021, President Joe Biden nominated Robin Carnahan to serve as administrator. She was confirmed by the US Senate on June 23, 2021.

The GSA consists of two major services: the Federal Acquisition Service (FAS), and the Public Buildings Service (PBS). In addition to these two major services, the agency also consists of twelve staff offices and two independent offices. The FAS provides both strategic and operational support for the acquisition of goods and services for other federal departments.

=== Past administrators ===
The following persons served as administrator of the General Services Administration:

No.	Image	Administrator	Term start	Term end	Refs.
1		Jess Larson	July 3, 1949	January 29, 1953	
Acting		Russell Forbe	February 10, 1953	May 1, 1953	
2		Edmund F. Mansure	May 2, 1953	February 29, 1956	
3		Franklin G. Floete	May 3, 1956	January 20, 1961	
4		John Moore	February 7, 1961	November 25, 1961	
5		Bernard L. Boutin	November 27, 1961	November 30, 1964	
6		Lawson B. Knott Jr.	December 1, 1965	February 28, 1969	
7		Robert Lowe Kunzig	March 17, 1969	January 14, 1972	
Acting		Rod Kreger	January 17, 1972	June 1, 1972	
8		Arthur F. Sampson	June 2, 1972	October 15, 1975	
9		Jack Eckerd	November 21, 1975	February 11, 1977	
Acting		Robert Griffin	February 15, 1977	April 29, 1977	
10		Jay Solomon	April 30, 1977	March 31, 1979	
Acting		Paul Goulding	April 1, 1979	June 29, 1979	
11		Rowland G. Freeman III	July 2, 1979	January 14, 1981	
Acting		Raymond Adam Kline	January 15, 1981	May 25, 1981	
12		Gerald P. Carmen	May 26, 1981	February 29, 1984	
Acting		Raymond Adam Kline	March 1, 1984	March 3, 1985	
Acting		Dwight Ink	March 4, 1985	June 28, 1985	
13		Terence Golden	June 29, 1985	March 18, 1988	
Acting		Paul Trause	March 19, 1988	March 31, 1988	
Acting		John Alderson	April 1, 1988	September 26, 1988	
14		Richard Austin	September 27, 1988	January 20, 1993	
Acting		Robert Jones	January 20, 1993	February 3, 1993	
Acting		Dennis Fischer	February 4, 1993	June 13, 1993	
Acting		Julia Stasch	June 13, 1993	July 7, 1993	
15		Roger Johnson	July 8, 1993	February 29, 1996	
16		David J. Barram	March 4, 1996	December 15, 2000	
Acting		Thurman Davis	December 16, 2000	May 30, 2001	
17		Stephen A. Perry	May 31, 2001	October 31, 2005	
Acting		David Bibb	November 1, 2005	May 30, 2006	
18		Lurita A. Doan	May 31, 2006	April 30, 2008	
Acting		David Bibb	May 1, 2008	August 29, 2008	
Acting		James A. Williams	August 30, 2008	January 20, 2009	
Acting		Paul F. Prouty	January 20, 2009	December 21, 2009	
Acting		Stephen R. Leeds	December 22, 2009	February 6, 2010	
19		Martha N. Johnson	February 7, 2010	April 2, 2012	
Acting		Daniel M. Tangherlini	April 3, 2012	July 4, 2013	
20		Daniel M. Tangherlini	July 5, 2013	February 21, 2015	
Acting		Denise Turner Roth	February 22, 2015	August 6, 2015	
21		Denise Turner Roth	August 7, 2015	January 20, 2017	
Acting		Tim Horne	January 20, 2017	December 11, 2017	
22		Emily W. Murphy	December 12, 2017	January 15, 2021	
Acting		Alison Brigatti	January 15, 2021	January 20, 2021	
Acting		Katy Kale	January 20, 2021	July 2, 2021	
23		Robin Carnahan	July 2, 2021	January 20, 2025	
Acting		Stephen Ehikian	January 20, 2025	July 21, 2025	
Acting		Michael Rigas	July 21, 2025	December 24, 2025	
24		Edward Forst	December 24, 2025	Incumbent	

==== Staff offices ====
- Office of Government-wide Policy
- Office of the Chief Financial Officer
- Office of Human Resources Management
- Office of GSA IT
- Office of Administrative Services
- Office of Congressional and Intergovernmental Affairs
- Office of Strategic Communication
- Office of Small Business Utilization
- Office of General Counsel
- Office of Civil Rights
- Office of Mission Assurance
- Office of Customer Experience

==== Independent offices ====
- Office of Inspector General
- Civilian Board of Contract Appeals

=== Regions ===
The GSA conducts its business activities through 11 offices (known as GSA regions) throughout the United States. These regional offices are located in Atlanta, Boston, Chicago, Denver, Fort Worth, Kansas City (Missouri), New York City, Philadelphia, San Francisco, Seattle (Auburn), and Washington, D.C.

Region	Region name	Complex	Location
1	New England	Thomas P. O'Neill Jr. Federal Building	Boston, MA
2	Northeast and Caribbean	1 World Trade Center	New York, NY
3	Mid-Atlantic	100 S Independence Mall W	Philadelphia, PA
4	Southeast Sunbelt	Martin Luther King, Jr. Federal Building	Atlanta, GA
5	Great Lakes	John C. Kluczynski Federal Building	Chicago, IL
6	Heartland	Two Pershing Square	Kansas City, MO
7	Greater Southwest	Fritz G. Lanham Federal Building	Fort Worth, TX
8	Rocky Mountain	Denver Federal Center	Denver (Lakewood), CO
9	Pacific Rim	50 United Nations Plaza	San Francisco, CA
10	Northwest/Arctic	400 15th Street SW	Auburn, WA
11	National Capital	1800 F St NW	Washington, DC

== Operations ==
=== Procurement and the GSA Schedule ===
The Federal Acquisition Service (FAS) provides products and services available to federal agencies across the U.S. government. The GSA assists with procurement work for other government agencies. As part of this effort, it maintains the GSA Schedule Program, which other agencies can use to buy goods and services. The GSA Schedule can be thought of as a collection of pre-negotiated contracts. Procurement managers from government agencies can view these agreements and make purchases from the GSA Schedule by following the appropriate procedures prescribed by Federal Acquisition Regulation, or FAR, Subpart 8.4.

The GSA Schedule is awarded as a prime contract entered into by the federal government and a vendor that has submitted an acceptable proposal. At the core of the GSA Schedule contract lie two key concepts: 1) Basis of Award customer or group of customers and 2) Price Reduction Clause. The two concepts are applied in concert to achieve the government's pricing objectives for the GSA Schedule program. Namely, the government wants to ensure that when the vendor experiences competitive pressures to reduce its pricing, then the government can benefit from these and be extended reduced pricing as well.

The Basis of Award customer or group of customers represents the customer or group of customers whose sales are affected on the same terms and conditions as those with GSA, and whose pricing is used: 1) as the baseline during negotiations to establish discounts offered to GSA, and 2) as a price floor that, when breached, constitutes additional discounting that triggers the Price Reduction Clause.

The Price Reduction Clause ensures that vendor discounting practices and GSA Schedule prices maintain a fixed relationship. The vendor specifies in its GSA proposal, and during negotiations of GSA Schedule contract prices, the discounts to be given to Basis of Award customer(s). If the vendor then provides a larger discount to a Basis of Award customer than what was agreed upon in the GSA Schedule contract (i.e., if the price floor is breached), then the vendor's GSA price will be reduced proportionately and retroactively.

Effective Price Reduction Clause compliance procedures will protect vendors if their discounting practices are fully and accurately disclosed in their original proposals to GSA and then are used as a basis for compliance over the term of the contract. Although not ideal, a compliance system implemented after a contract has been awarded can bring a contract into compliance, although sometimes at the expense of profits. If implementing a system in the middle of a contract period, inaccuracies that turn up should be corrected immediately, and the GSA contracting officer should be made aware of them. Price Reduction Clause compliance systems and procedures can range from simple to complex. A simple, manual system would be appropriate for a service contractor with standard labor rates that are not discounted. A complex system would be required for a reseller with thousands of products and discounting policies that differ among product groups.

In response to increased mandates and standards required by the Federal Government of its agencies and in a push to plan for federal sustainability, GSA offers online tools to aid in the building and management of government offices that are subject to these requirements.

The GSA has delegated authority to the Department of Veterans Affairs (VA) to procure medical supplies under the VA Federal Supply Schedules Program.

In 2018, the GSA awarded federal government debt collection services to IC System.

=== Federal property and buildings ===
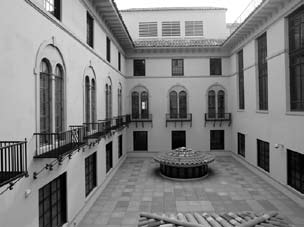
Thoughtful analysis to balance GSA preservation, cost, and performance goals supported historic window retention with replacement of non-historic windows at this 1930 courthouse.

The Public Buildings Service (PBS) acquires and manages thousands of federal properties. In accordance with Title 40 of the United States Code, the GSA is charged with promulgating regulations governing the acquisition, use, and disposal of real property (real estate and land) and personal property (essentially all other property). This activity is centered in the GSA's Office of Governmentwide Policy. Policies promulgated by the GSA are developed in collaboration with federal agencies and are typically published for public comment in the Federal Register before publication as a Final Rule.

The Public Buildings Service provides offices for its customers (I.e., federal agencies) and provides United States courthouses at good economies to the American taxpayer. PBS is funded primarily through the Federal Buildings Fund, which is supported by the rent from federal customer agencies.

The Office of Property Disposal of the PBS manages the disposal of surplus real property. The Office is responsible for land, office buildings, warehouses, former post offices, farms, family residences, commercial facilities, and airfields located in the United States, Puerto Rico, the U.S. Virgin Islands, and the U.S. Pacific Territories. Surplus property is made available to both government and private bidders and, in some cases, land sold for public purposes (such as parks or welfare) may be discounted by up to 100% of FMV.

Twenty-four GSA green buildings have earned LEED ratings. Some green offerings include green roofs, underfloor air distribution, use of renewable power from utility companies, and light shelves (located outside of the building that reduce the amount of heat radiating into the building from the sun while increasing the amount of natural light and high ceilings that help direct daylight deep into the work environment). The American Recovery and Reinvestment Act of 2009 made available not less than $4.5 billion for measures necessary to convert GSA facilities to High-Performance Green Buildings, as defined in the Energy Independence and Security Act of 2007 (Public Law 110-140).

The Department of Energy's Federal Energy Management Program facilitates the GSA's implementation under the Act through project transaction services, applied technology services, and decision support services, deploying renewable energy technologies and cultivating change to embrace energy efficiency.

In 2004, the GSA was presented with the Honor Award from the National Building Museum for "success in creating and maintaining innovative environments for the federal community as well as providing a positive federal presence for the public".

=== Federal vehicle fleet management ===
The GSA contributes to the management of U.S. Federal property, including a 215,000 vehicle motor pool.

The American Recovery and Reinvestment Act of 2009 (stimulus bill) included $300 million to acquire energy-efficient motor vehicles for the federal fleet. President Barack Obama announced that the GSA was to support the U.S. auto industry with orders for about 17,600 new fuel-efficient vehicles by June 1, 2009, on an accelerated schedule, with money from the American Recovery and Reinvestment Act. GSA was to pay $285 million to General Motors Corporation, Chrysler LLC, and Ford Motor Company. It was to include 2,500 hybrid sedans—the largest one-time purchase yet of hybrid vehicles for the federal government—and each new vehicle was claimed to yield at least a 10% fuel economy improvement over its predecessor. GSA was to spend $15 million more that year on a pilot fleet of advanced-technology vehicles, including all-electric vehicles and hybrid buses.

Hybrids accounted for about 10 percent of the 145,473 vehicles the GSA bought during the fiscal years 2009 and 2010, after making up less than 1 percent of government vehicle purchases in 2008. As for specific models, President Obama took a buy-American stance. The U.S. government bought about two-thirds of the Chevrolet Malibu Hybrids sold during the past two years, and almost a third of the Ford Fusion Hybrids, but only 17 Toyota Prius hybrids and five Honda Civic Hybrids. Ground Force One, so designated when transporting the POTUS, is one of two armored buses procured in 2010 for the transportation of dignitaries under protection of the Secret Service, at a cost of $1.1 million each. The coaches were assembled in Tennessee on frames made in Canada.

=== Interagency Resources Management Conference ===
The Interagency Resources Management Conference (IRMCO) was a federal executive conference of the GSA, held annually between 1961 and 2011 as a multi-day offsite event. It gave awards to federal government teams that improved government operations or communications with the public. Its attendees included Senior Executive Service members from a range of agencies, along with members of industry. After IRMCO 2011, the GSA announced that it was discontinuing IRMCO because it no longer had a purpose. Instead, in 2012 the GSA held a one-day Acquisition Excellence event focused on efficiency.

=== Technology Transformation Services ===
The GSA established the Federal Citizen Information Center in 1970 (now USAGov) to connect the public to government information and services. In 2009, the GSA created the Office of Citizen Services and Innovative Technologies (now the Office of Products and Programs) to expand the effort to serve the public through technology.

In 2014, the GSA began managing the Presidential Innovation Fellows program and launched 18F with a team focused on improving the federal government's digital services. Between 2014 and 2024, 18F worked with 34 agencies on 455 projects, such as improving online permitting and complaint submission processes. 18F helped the Federal Election Commission move its website to the Cloud.gov platform, which FEC projected would save it $1.2 million annually.

The GSA established the IT Modernization Centers of Excellence in 2017 to accelerate the modernization of IT infrastructure and reduce legacy IT spending across the government. The Centers of Excellence are a fee-for-service consulting service. For example, they helped the Agriculture Department avoid $42 million in costs by closing data centers.

The GSA consolidated those offices into the Technology Transformation Service (TTS) in 2016, which became a sub-unit of the Federal Acquisition Service in 2017. Its mission was to improve the lives of the public and public servants by transforming how the government uses technology. TTS aims to meet the government's technology needs: acquisition, omnichannel experience, intelligent process automation, infrastructure optimization and cloud, accelerators and innovation, data and analytics, and identity management.

In 2019, TTS became responsible for shared services created in previous years by 18F: Login.gov, a credentials vouchsafer, and Cloud.gov, a hosting platform. The following year, TTS's consulting teams experienced significant demand due to pressures on federal agencies to respond to the coronavirus pandemic. In 2021, GSA announced the creation of the U.S. Digital Corps, a two year fellowship for early career technologists with specialities in software engineering, data science, design, and cybersecurity, housed within TTS. TTS programs also included Data.gov. That same year, TTS began investing in automation of security authorization processes for the FedRAMP program. TTS and 18F assisted with the development of multiple websites and applications in 2024, including the retroactive IRS Direct File pilot that was abated in the 1960s, Cybersecurity and Infrastructure Security Agency's get.gov, and the American Climate Corps. TTS also launched Notify.gov.

On March 1, 2025, the entire 18F office was eliminated "under direction from the White House" and weeks after Elon Musk claimed the "group was deleted." Less than a month before dissolving the office, Musk associate and TTS director Thomas Shedd told 18F and TTS that "You all are one of the most respected technology [intern] groups in the federal government," saying that 18F engineers "are so key and critical to this next phase" of sustaining federal government technology.

=== Section 1122 Program ===
Section 1122 of the 1994 National Defense Authorization Legislation enabled state and local government agencies to purchase defense and other federal equipment to support drug prohibition activity. In 2009, the reauthorization bill expanded the program to purchases for use in homeland security operations. The program is owned and managed by the Department of Defense (DOD), and equipment is made available by the Defense Logistics Agency (DLA) and the GSA, as is also done under the 1033 program.

== See also ==
- Building code
- Energy Efficiency and Conservation Block Grants
- Federal Building (disambiguation)
- General Schedule (US civil service pay scale)
- Geographic Locator Codes
- GSA Advantage
- Public Works and Government Services Canada
- Washington Headquarters Services
- Technology Modernization Fund
