= GSA Advantage =

United States government purchasing system

- logo

Agency overview
- Parent department: General Services Administration
- Website: gsaadvantage.gov

GSA Advantage is an online government purchasing service run by the General Services Administration (GSA).

GSA Advantage is an online shopping and ordering service created within the GSA for use by government agencies to buy commercial products and services. Its mission is to provide a streamlined purchasing portal for federal agencies to acquire goods and services.

The service is intended to benefit any federal agency that has access to the GSA Advantage program; however, two federal acts have also allowed state and local governments to access and purchase from this service. Section 833 of the John Warner National Defense Authorization Act authorizes the Administrator of General Services to provide state and local governments the use of GSA's Federal Supply Schedules for the purchase of products and services to be used to facilitate recovery from a major disaster, terrorism or nuclear, biological, chemical, or radiological attack. Section 211 of the E-Government Act of 2002 authorized GSA sales of IT products and services to state and local governments through the introduction of cooperative purchasing.

In 2021, The Intercept and video surveillance industry publication IPVN reported that GSA Advantage listed products in non-compliance with the John S. McCain National Defense Authorization Act for Fiscal Year 2019, including re-branded products manufactured by sanctioned entities such as Dahua Technology and Hikvision.
