= Dan Tangherlini =

American civil servant (born 1967)

Daniel Tangherlini
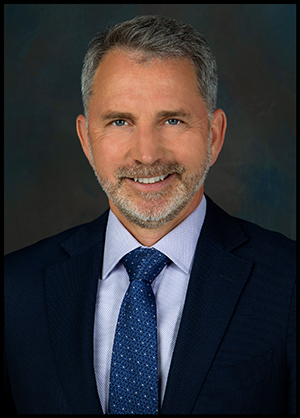

Governor of the United States Postal Service
- Incumbent
- Assumed office May 20, 2022
- Appointed by: Joe Biden
- Preceded by: Ron Bloom

Administrator of General Services
- In office April 2, 2012 – February 21, 2015
- President: Barack Obama
- Deputy: Susan Brita
- Preceded by: Martha Johnson
- Succeeded by: Denise Turner Roth

Assistant Secretary of the Treasury for Management
- In office July 2009 – April 2, 2012
- President: Barack Obama
- Preceded by: Peter B. McCarthy
- Succeeded by: Nani A. Coloretti

Director of the District of Columbia Department of Transportation
- In office May 20, 2002 – February 10, 2006
- Mayor: Anthony A. Williams
- Preceded by: Position established
- Succeeded by: Michelle L. Pourciau

Personal details
- Born: Daniel Mark Tangherlini; 1967 (age 57–58) Copenhagen, Denmark
- Political party: Democratic
- Children: 2
- Education: University of Chicago (BA, MPP); University of Pennsylvania (MBA)

Daniel Mark Tangherlini (born 1967) is an American government official who currently serves as a Governor of the United States Postal Service. He served as administrator of the U.S. General Services Administration from 2012 to 2015. Unanimously approved to the post by the U.S. Senate on June 27, 2013, he had served as Acting Administrator since his appointment by President Barack Obama on April 2, 2012. He earlier served as an executive in the U.S. Department of the Treasury, as City Administrator of Washington, D.C., and as interim General Manager for the Washington Metropolitan Area Transit Authority.

== Education ==
Tangherlini earned a Bachelor of Arts and Master of Public Policy from the University of Chicago, followed by a Master of Business Administration from the Wharton School of the University of Pennsylvania.

== Career ==
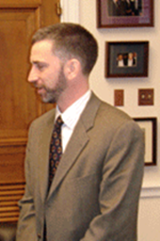
Dan Tangherlini at a meeting with Rep. Jim Moran in 2006

Tangherlini began his career as a Presidential Management Fellow at the Office of Management and Budget in 1991. He progressed through several positions in his time at OMB, and he transferred to the U.S. Department of Transportation in 1997. He worked for the U.S. Secretary of Transportation, where his work included Amtrak labor settlement negotiations and development of new approaches to infrastructure financing.

In November 1998 Tangherlini was loaned to the District of Columbia government, where he served as acting Chief Financial Officer for the Metropolitan Police Department. The position became permanent, and he remained in the role until May 2000, and then as the director of the District of Columbia Department of Transportation until February 2006.

Tangherlini then succeeded Richard A. White as interim General Manager of the Washington Metropolitan Area Transit Authority, which operates the Metrorail and Metrobus systems in the Washington, D.C., area. He withdrew from consideration as Metro's permanent General Manager in November 2006 after accepting the position of City Administrator in the cabinet of Adrian Fenty, then Democratic nominee for Mayor. Fenty and Tangherlini each signed letters of intent agreeing to join forces.

Beginning July 24, 2009, he served as Assistant Secretary of the Treasury for Management, Chief Financial Officer, and Chief Performance Officer at the U.S. Department of the Treasury.

Tangherlini was named Acting Administrator of the U.S. General Services Administration on April 2, 2012, after the abrupt resignation of former Administrator Martha Johnson following the White House's discovery of the findings of an Inspector General's investigation into the misuse of taxpayer funds for an October 2010 employee conference in Las Vegas.

On May 22, 2013, President Barack Obama announced his intent to nominate Tangherlini as Administrator of the General Services Administration saying, "As Acting Director, Dan helped restore the trust of the American people in the General Services Administration by making the agency more efficient, accountable and transparent. I want to thank Dan for his leadership over the past year and for agreeing to continue serving in the Administration." Tangerhlini was confirmed by the Senate on June 27, 2013, as the 20th Administrator of General Services.

On January 15, 2015, Tangerhlini has announced plans to step down at the GSA (on February 13, 2015), according to a letter to GSA employees. Deputy Administrator Denise Turner Roth will take on the role of acting administrator until President Obama chooses a replacement.

His new job is as chief operating officer of a firm, Artemis Real Estate Partners, that has raised $2 billion in real estate capital since its founding in 2009. Based in Chevy Chase, the firm places money across the U.S. in office, housing, retail, industrial and other properties.

Tangherlini is a member of the National Infrastructure Advisory Council.

In November 2021, President Biden announced he would appoint Tangherlini to the Board of Governors of the United States Postal Service. On May 12, 2022, his nomination was confirmed in the Senate by voice vote.

== Personal life ==
Tangherlini is married to Theresa Picillo, and they have two children. He is a member of several Capitol Hill community groups.

Civic offices
Preceded by Richard White	General Manager of the Washington Metropolitan Area Transit Authority; 2006	Succeeded by John Catoe
Preceded by Edward Reiskin; Acting	City Administrator of the District of Columbia; 2006–2009	Succeeded by Neil Albert
Political offices
Preceded by Martha Johnson	Administrator of General Services; 2012–2015	Succeeded by Denise Turner Roth
