= Lurita Doan =

American businesswoman

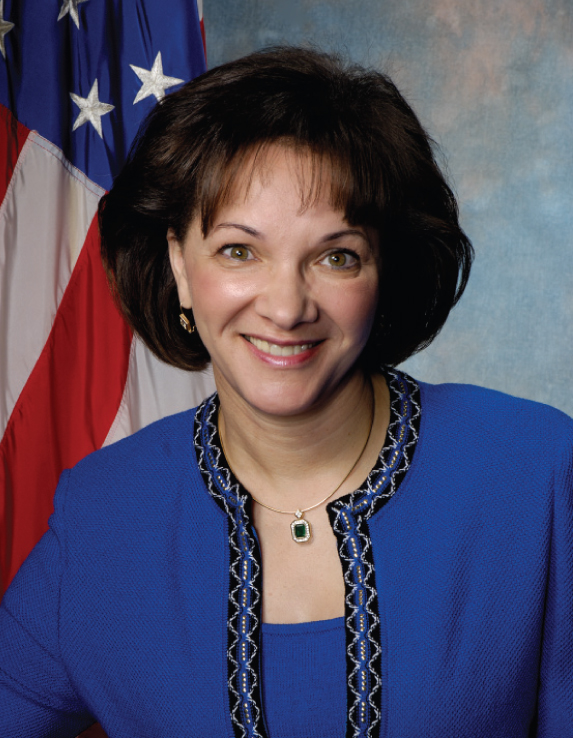

18th Administrator of the U.S. General Services Administration
- In office May 31, 2006 – April 29, 2008
- President: George W. Bush
- Deputy: David Bibb (2003–2008)
- Preceded by: Stephen A. Perry
- Succeeded by: James A. Williams (acting)

Personal details
- Born: Lurita Alexis; January 4, 1958 (age 68) New Orleans, Louisiana, U.S.
- Party: Republican
- Education: Vassar College; University of Tennessee
- Profession: Radio Commentator

Lurita Alexis Doan (born Lurita Alexis; January 4, 1958) is a businesswoman, political commentator, and former Republican appointee who was the administrator of the United States General Services Administration, the government's contracting agency, from May 31, 2006, to April 29, 2008, during the administration of Republican U.S. President George W. Bush. She is the first woman to have held this position.

A member of the Republican Party, Doan is a conservative commentator on Federal News Radio 1500AM in Washington, D.C. She hosts the weekly opinion editorial, "Leadership Matters".

== Early life ==
Doan was born in New Orleans in 1958, the daughter of Lucien Victor Alexis, Jr., head of a New Orleans business school for black students, and his wife, who is of Louisiana Creole ancestry. Alexis' paternal grandfather was Lucien Alexis, Sr., a New Orleans businessman. Doan attended Ursuline Academy, a Roman Catholic school for girls in New Orleans. She graduated from Ursuline in 1975. Doan graduated with honors in English from Vassar College in Poughkeepsie, New York. Doan received a master's degree in Renaissance Literature in 1983 from the University of Tennessee, Knoxville.

== Business career ==
In 1984, Doan began teaching as an adjunct professor at colleges in Louisiana, Washington, D.C., and Northern Virginia. Beginning in 1986, she worked four years with Unisys as a technician deploying Unix systems. In 1990, Doan launched her company, New Technology Management Inc. Minority-contractor certification helped her gain government contracts. In 1993, Doan secured a $250,000 Navy contract to install Unix on ships. By 2002, her company's revenues had grown to $29 million. After 15 years in business, in 2005, Doan sold her firm for an undisclosed sum to a group of investors and retired. By that time it was specializing in selling "surveillance equipment to the federal government and others for border security and other projects."

== Political career ==
As a businesswoman, Doan had become active in the Republican Party. On April 6, 2006, Doan was nominated by President George W. Bush to head the General Services Administration, which manages contracting for business supplies, technology, telecommunications, and a variety of services, as well as managing an enormous real estate portfolio of owned and leased properties. She was confirmed by unanimous consent in the U.S. Senate on May 26 and was sworn in as the 18th administrator of GSA on May 31. On April 29, 2008 Doan submitted her resignation in accordance with a request from the White House, which did not disclose the reason for the request. The resignation followed a recommendation by the United States Office of Special Counsel to discipline Doan for violating the Hatch Act, which relates to political activities by civil service employees. In addition, there had been a period of internal GSA conflicts with the agency's inspector general and a number of congressional and special counsel inquiries.

== Recent ==
In July 2008, Doan began her "Leadership Matters" commentaries on Federal News Radio in Washington, D.C., discussing government contracting, federal budget issues, and government managerial practices. She has occasionally published opinion editorials in several major U.S. daily newspapers, such as USA Today and The Los Angeles Times. Doan has also appeared as a guest contributor on Fox News, CNN and other cable networks with commentary on fiscal discipline, government contracting practices, the federal budget and current affairs.

Doan is a member of the Belizean Grove, an invitation-only women's social club based in New York City.

== Politics ==
Between 1999 and 2006, Doan and her husband, Douglas, a former military intelligence officer and business liaison official at the Department of Homeland Security, donated nearly $226,000 to Republican campaigns and causes. Doan, a Republican Party member, was cited by Vice President Dick Cheney in a speech at the Small Business Administration in 2003.

She met with President George W. Bush in 2004, as a female minority owner of a small business, in 2004. In 2004, Doan addressed the Republican National Convention.

== Controversies ==
Within weeks of assuming her position as head of the GSA in 2006, Doan proposed a no-bid contract with public relations firm owner Edie Fraser for an analysis of how GSA could improve on its record of awarding business to minority and woman-owned businesses. Doan and her prior company, New Technology Management, had an "extensive personal and business relationship" with Fraser. Doan did not have authority to award such a contract on a no-bid basis, and the proposal was called off. Rep. Henry Waxman (D-CA), chairman of the House Committee on Oversight and Government Reform, later alleged that Doan "attempted to go forward with issuing a $20,000 no-bid contract to Fraser even after GSA General Counsel Alan Swendiman repeatedly advised that the contract be terminated due to its questionable legality." Swendiman later transferred to work in the White House Office of Administration.

In 2007, the Washington Post reported on several controversies involving Doan. In one, Doan intervened in an effort to determine whether five major contractors should be suspended from doing business with the federal government for failing to turn over rebates on travel on government contracts. In another, Doan proposed to curb the agency's contract audits and to cut the inspector general's budget by $5 million. The inspector general had reported that the audits, which aim to ensure that the government is getting the best prices for goods and services, had saved taxpayers more than $1 billion over the previous two years. Doan contended that the budget cuts were part of an attempt to rein in spending at the GSA. In March 2007, a Congressional investigation by the Committee on Oversight and Government Reform produced findings critical of Doan. Ranking Member Rep. Tom Davis (R-VA) published a separate set of findings defending her conduct.

On March 26, 2007, in a front page story, the Washington Post reported Doan had violated the Hatch Act:

Witnesses have told congressional investigators that the chief of the General Services Administration and a deputy in Karl Rove's political affairs office at the White House joined in a video conference earlier this year with top GSA political appointees, who discussed ways to help Republican candidates. With GSA Administrator Lurita Alexis Doan and up to 40 regional administrators on hand, J. Scott Jennings, the White House's deputy director of political affairs, gave a PowerPoint presentation on Jan. 26 [2007] of polling data about the 2006 elections. Investigators state that the Hatch Act may have been violated when the question "How can we help our candidates?" was allegedly asked by Lurita Doan, according to a few unidentified witnesses at the meeting. The Hatch Act states that federal resources may not be used for partisan politics. The Office of Special Counsel investigated Hatch Act questions at GSA.

Doan appeared in front of the Committee on Oversight and Government Reform on June 13, 2007, whereupon Chairman Waxman suggested she resign. In a House Oversight Committee staff report, Congressman Tom Davis cited evidence that the General Counsel Alan Swendiman only "sent a memo to Chief of Staff John Phelps stating that Diversity Best Practices should be notified in writing of the termination of the "service order," and that Swendiman and Doan never spoke on this matter.

Doan also faced accusations of interfering with the extension of a contract involving Sun Microsystems. Sun Microsystems announced the end of its long-standing contract with the federal government in mid-September 2007. However, the week before Sun announced its decision, Doan alerted Congress to factors that may provide disincentives for companies to do work with the federal government. Doan expressed her concerns in a September 7, 2007, letter to Sen. Charles Grassley (R-IA) about the credibility of the GSA Inspector General's office and how that credibility gap can adversely affect relations with vendors, stating:

Over the past several months, I have heard complaints questioning the ability of the GSA's IG to conduct independent reviews in an unbiased manner. Contributing to this perception has been a troubling inability within the office of the IG to safeguard testimony and hold in strict confidence information provided. Companies involved in audits, as well as whistleblowers across the agency, must have the confidence that the IG will safeguard information provided. Sadly, there have been several instances where confidential information provided to the GSA IG was immediately leaked to media outlets, and I am concerned that these occurrences have fostered the impression that the IG's credibility is compromised.

Sun announced its decision to stop selling directly through the GSA.

On April 29, 2008, facing a recommendation by the United States Office of Special Counsel that Doan be "disciplined to the fullest extent" for "the most pernicious of political activity" prohibited by the Hatch Act and an ongoing congressional investigation, Doan submitted her resignation in accordance with a request from the White House. Doan stated that "It has been a great privilege to serve our nation and a great President."

Political offices
| Preceded by David Bibb; Acting | Administrator of General Services; Served under: George W. Bush; 2006–2008 | Succeeded by David Bibb; Acting |
