= USAGov =

Department in the United States government

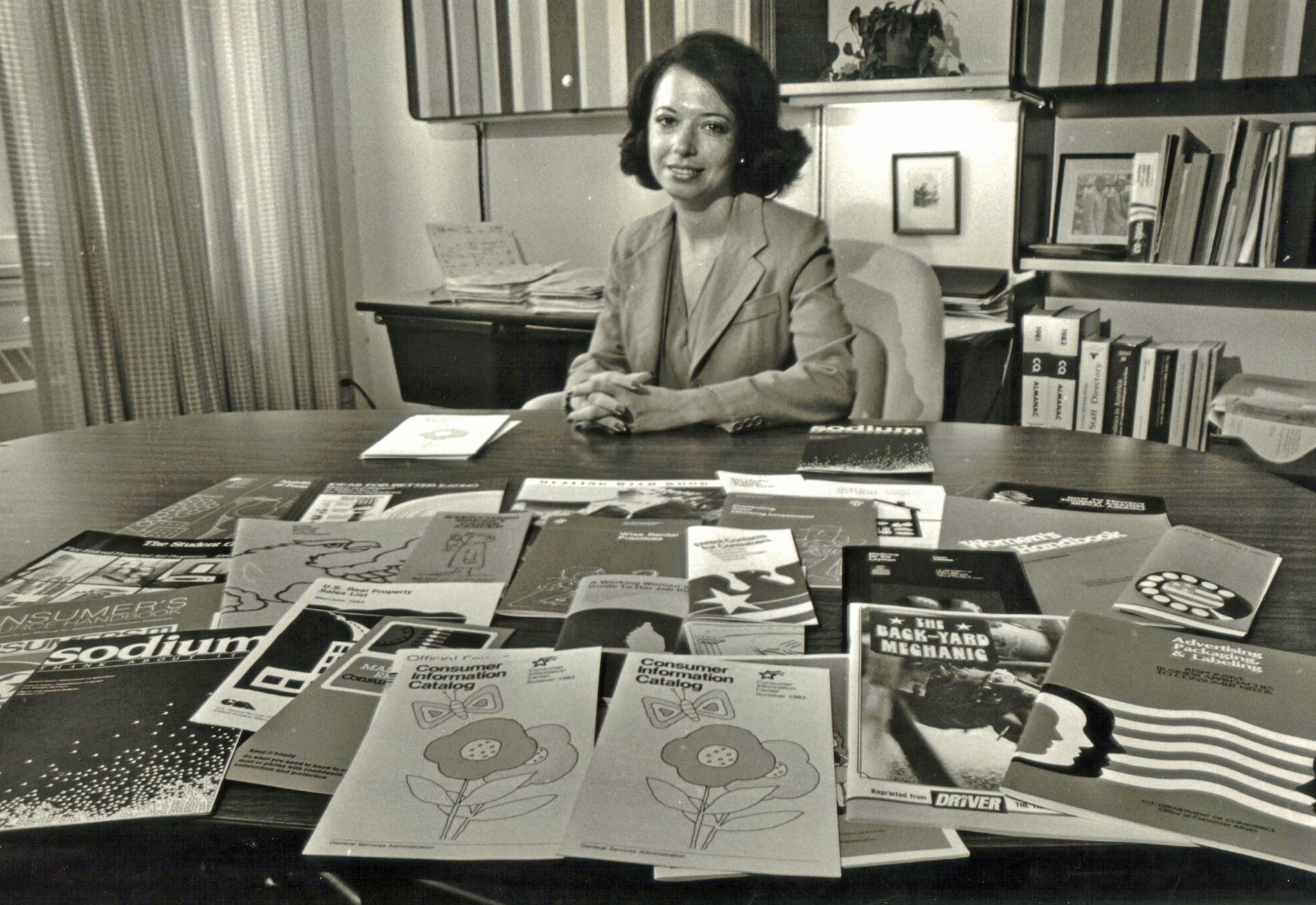
Government publications on the desk of former FCIC director Teresa Nasif

USAGov, formerly the Federal Citizen Information Center and Federal Consumer Information Center (FCIC), is a department in the United States government's General Services Administration. FCIC, founded in 1970, began as the federal government's distribution outlet for free and low cost federal consumer publications sent out from the Government Printing Office (GPO) facility in Pueblo, Colorado. Since 1970, FCIC's mission has broadened significantly to include helping people interact with the federal government via toll-free telephone numbers, print publications, and a family of web sites and other electronic resources such as Twitter and Facebook accounts. FCIC was renamed USAGov in 2015.

== Background ==
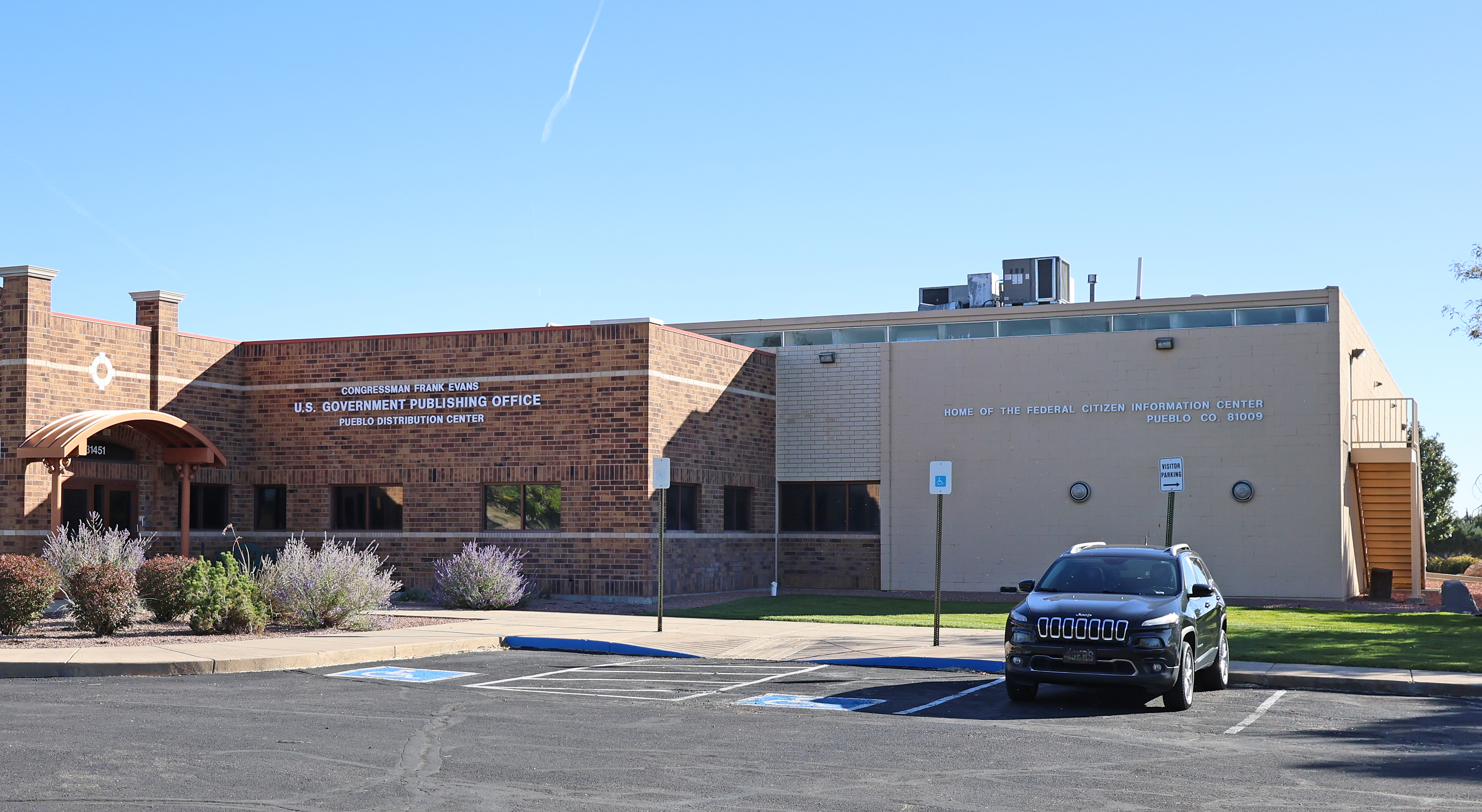
The distribution facility in Pueblo, Colorado (2023)

The FCIC distribution facility in Pueblo received so much mail that the United States Postal Service assigned it its own ZIP Code, 81009. A 2006 FCIC audience survey showed that more than 26% of the respondents recognized Pueblo as a source of helpful federal information. USAGov transferred its publication distribution program to the Government Publishing Office in 2016.

The facility was sited in Pueblo at the behest of U.S. Representative Frank Evans, who was born in the city, after questioning why only big cities were considered. In 2010 President Barack Obama signed a law renaming FCIC's building the Congressman Frank Evans Government Printing Office Distribution Center or the Frank Evans Government Printing Office Building.
