= Margie Graves =

American government technology executive

Federal Deputy Chief Information Officer, Office of Management and Budget
- In office 2016–2019

Personal details
- Born: Margaret Graves
- Education: University of Virginia (B.S. Chemistry); University of Virginia Darden School of Business (M.B.A.)
- Known for: Federal IT modernization, U.S. Department of Homeland Security IT leadership

Margie Graves (born Margaret Graves) is an American government technology executive. She served as Federal Deputy Chief Information Officer and Acting Federal CIO within the Office of Management and Budget (OMB) from 2016 to 2019, and previously as Deputy CIO at the U.S. Department of Homeland Security (DHS).

== Background ==
Graves holds a B.S. in Chemistry and an M.B.A. from the University of Virginia Darden School of Business. Before entering federal service she spent approximately ten years at the management consulting firm A.T. Kearney.

== Department of Homeland Security ==
Graves was one of the original "plank holders" of the U.S. Department of Homeland Security, helping to establish the agency following the September 11 attacks. Over 14 years at DHS, she rose to Deputy CIO, overseeing an IT portfolio of $5.4 billion in programs.

== Office of Management and Budget ==
Graves joined the Office of Management and Budget as Federal Deputy CIO in March 2016, and also served as Acting Federal CIO during the first year of the Trump administration. Working alongside Federal CIO Suzette Kent, she helped develop several government-wide IT initiatives, including the Cloud Smart policy, the Technology Modernization Fund, the Federal Cyber Reskilling Academy, and the Trusted Internet Connections program. She was named a Federal 100 Government Eagle Award winner in 2019. She departed OMB on December 31, 2019.

== Post-government career ==
Graves is a Senior Fellow with the IBM Center for The Business of Government and a fellow of the National Academy of Public Administration. She has served as President of the American Council for Technology and Chair of the Industry Advisory Council.
