= U.S. Web Design System =

Digital service provided by the United States Government

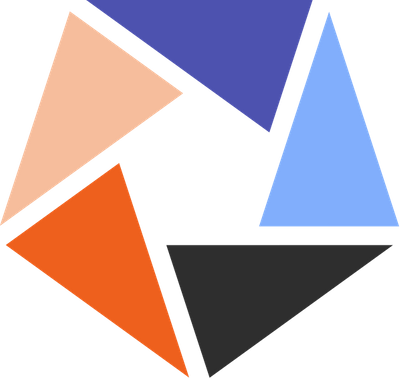
- Founded: 2015
- Area served: U.S. government and customers
- Owners: General Services Administration (GSA); Technology Transformation Services (TTS)
- Services: Web design system
- Website: designsystem.digital.gov
- Commercial: No

The U.S. Web Design System (USWDS) is a collection of user interface components and style guide for design patterns for web development. USWDS supports accessibility and mobile-friendly requirements and a consistent experience across government websites. It includes the font Public Sans.

== History ==
USWDS was created in 2015 as a collaboration between 18F, the United States Digital Service, and the 10x program. In 2018, the 21st Century Integrated Digital Experience Act (IDEA) mandated that executive branch websites meet the websites standards established by the Technology Transformation Services department, the department within which USWDS operates.

In 2019, USWDS launched version 2.0 which included a custom font, Public Sans. The Public Sans typeface allows for 9 different line weights. USWDS 3.0 was released in 2022 with support for Sass, a CSS pre-processor.

In September 2023, USWDS was in use at 94 agencies and 160 websites with an estimated 1.1 billion page views.

== Compliance with website requirements ==
U.S. government websites are required to comply with multiple accessibility requirements. The 21st Century Integrated Digital Experience Act (IDEA) stipulates that public-facing agency websites have a consistent look, include mobile-friendly versions of paper-based documents, and meet the accessibility needs of people with disabilities. The same year of the IDEA's signing, traffic from mobile devices surpassed desktop devices for the first time.

USWDS also seeks to help agencies meet Section 508 Amendment to the Rehabilitation Act of 1973 compliance.

== USWDS under the second Trump administration ==
In September 2026, the Treasury Department's chief information officer, Sam Corcos, and a Treasury AI engineer, Ryan Parker, took over leadership of USWDS after its longtime head, Anne Petersen, was placed on administrative leave. Parker announced plans to "automate as much accessibility testing as possible" using AI code-review tools such as OpenAI's Codex and CodeRabbit. The new team removed USWDS contributors from the project's GitHub repository and began blocking and deleting comments. Accessibility experts, including former USWDS engineering lead Matt Henry, criticized the plan, saying that only about 30% of accessibility testing can be reliably automated. In October 2026, nearly 200 technologists began building an independent copy of the system.

== See also ==
- Civic technology
- Service design
- 18F
- Technology Transformation Services
