= Hillary Hartley =

American technologist and government official

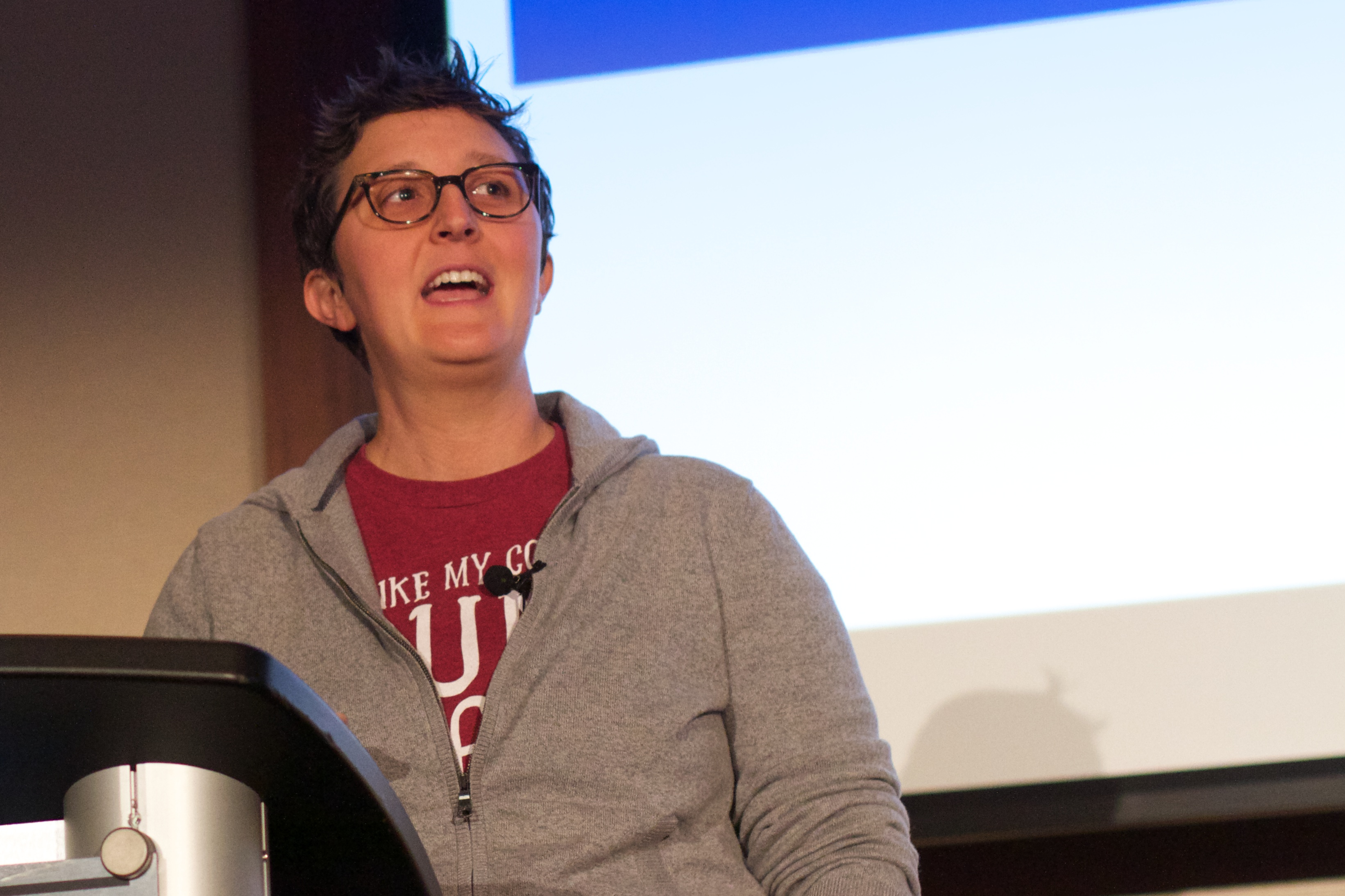

Chief Digital and Data Officer, Deputy Minister for Digital Government, Ontario
- In office April 2017 – March 2023

Co-founder and Deputy Executive Director, 18F
- In office January 2014 – April 2017

Personal details
- Education: Smith College (BA)
- Occupation: Technologist, Government Official

Hillary Hartley is an American technologist and government official who has served in both local and federal government in the US, and in the Canadian province of Ontario. From April 2023 until Mar 2025, she was the CEO of the U.S. Digital Response, a non-profit organization supporting public sector organizations in the USA.

Hartley was the Chief Digital and Data Officer and Deputy Minister for Digital Government, Cabinet Office, for the province of Ontario, the first person to hold this position, taking office in April 2017. As the head of the Ontario Digital Service, based within the Treasury Board Secretariat, she was responsible for leading the provincial government's digital transformation efforts and for operationalizing the Simpler, Faster, Better Services Act of 2019. As part of her role, she also chaired the government's Digital Government Board.

Prior to her role in Ontario, Hartley was a co-founder and Deputy Executive Director of 18F, a digital services agency within the United States federal government based within the General Services Administration. She had been a Presidential Innovation Fellow working on the MyUSA service, and together with a group of former fellows founded 18F in March 2014 under the Obama administration.

Hartley previously worked as Director of Integrated Marketing at government technology vendor NIC; created the first nationwide polling place lookup site MyPollingPlace.com during the 2004 federal election cycle,;and earlier in her career worked as a web designer for Arkansas.gov.

Hartley has been involved in a variety of community-based events in the government space, including eDemocracyCamp, TranparencyCamp, Gov2.0Camp, and CityCamp. Following the passage of Prop 8 in California, she co-founded Equality Camp, an event to bring technologists together with activists for marriage equality and LGBT rights.

As an early adopter of Twitter, Hartley has used the handle @hillary since 2006, which has caused confusion and attracted misdirected mentions intended for Hillary Clinton.

== Personal life and education ==
Hartley holds a Bachelor's in Sociology from Smith College in Massachusetts.

She is gay and lives with her wife and two children in Toronto, Ontario.
