= Presidential Innovation Fellows =

United States government fellowship program

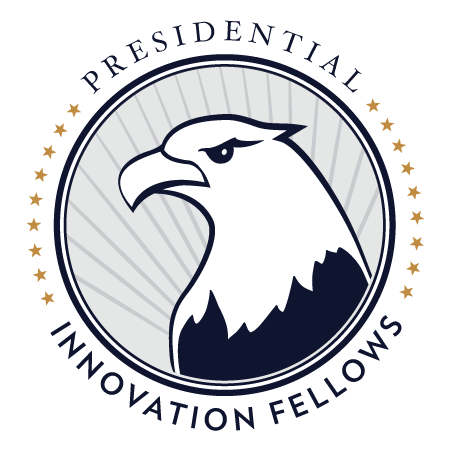

Agency overview
- Formed: May 2012; 14 years ago
- Parent department: Technology Transformation Services, General Services Administration
- Website: presidentialinnovationfellows.gov

The Presidential Innovation Fellows program is a competitive fellowship program that pairs top innovators from the private sector, non-profits, and academia with top innovators in government to collaborate on solutions that aim to deliver significant results in months, not years. It was established in 2012 and has operated continuously since then. The program focuses on generating measurable results, using innovation techniques from private industry such as Lean Startup, Design Thinking, and Agile Development. It is a service of GSA's Technology Transformation Services department.

The highly competitive program features an acceptance rate in the single digits. In the inaugural round in the summer of 2012, over 700 applicants competed for 18 fellowships. The second class included 43 fellows selected from over 2000 applicants. The third round consisted of 27 fellows selected from over 1500 applicants. The Presidential Innovation Fellows program and the fellows themselves are commonly referred to by the shorthand “PIF” (pronounced “Pif”).

In 2015, President Barack Obama issued an Executive Order making the Presidential Innovation Fellows program a permanent part of the U.S. federal government.

== Background ==
Presidential Innovation Fellows Logo (mid-2013)

Presidential Innovation Fellows Logo (original, early 2013)

The Presidential Innovation Fellows program was founded by former U.S. Chief Technology Officer Todd Park, former U.S. Chief Information Officer Steven VanRoekel, former Department of Veterans Affairs Chief Technology Officer and White House Fellowship alumnus Peter L. Levin, and former White House Office of Science and Technology Policy Senior Advisor for Innovation John Paul Farmer. Park served as the executive champion for the program and Farmer as its founding director.

Around the time of its founding, Park said the new program "will bring top innovators from outside government for focused "tours of duty" with our best federal innovators on game-changing projects. Combining the know-how of citizen change agents and government change agents in small, agile teams that move at high speed, these projects aim to deliver significant results within six months." On the White House blog, Farmer wrote, “The first five missions include creating common-sense tools for public participation, liberating government data to fuel job growth, giving everyone secure access to their own health information, streamlining the government contracting process for high-growth startups, and getting more bang for our foreign aid buck.”

Those interested in the program were invited to visit a webpage that explained the program in the following terms: The Presidential Innovation Fellows program pairs top innovators from the private sector, non-profits, and academia with top innovators in government to collaborate on solutions that aim to deliver significant results in six months. Each team of innovators works together in-person in Washington, DC on focused sprints while being supported by a broader community of interested citizens throughout the country. What makes this initiative unique is its focus on unleashing the ingenuity and know-how of Americans from all sectors.

Originally hiring in groups of "classes" or "rounds," in 2015 the Presidential Innovation Fellows program was updated to rolling recruitment to better fit the timing needs of agencies and administration priorities. According to the White House, "Applications will be accepted throughout the year...[T]hey will be reviewed in the order they are received and candidates will be accepted on a rolling basis."

== Relationship to other Presidential fellowships and federal programs ==
=== 18F ===
18F, the digital agency of the General Services Administration, grew out of the Presidential Innovation Fellows program in 2014, originally consisting of eleven Presidential Innovation Fellow alumni and four other federal public servants. As PIF alum Ben Balter has noted, "the PIF program was a success, and soon after a group called 18F was created within the General Services Administration (GSA) not only to house the PIFs, both physically and bureaucratically, but also to continue and augment their efforts — to centralize forward-thinking technologists in government under one administrative umbrella, and to provide a vehicle for change that wasn’t tied so closely to the administration and the highly political world in which it operates on a daily basis."

=== United States Digital Service ===
The United States Digital Service, or USDS, launched in 2014 and provides consultation services to federal agencies on large-scale information technology projects. USDS seeks to simplify and improve federal websites and other digital service delivery tools. As PIF alum Ben Balter has noted, "unlike 18F, which is approached by agencies asking for help, USDS has a shortlist of administration priorities that it actively pursues." Like the PIF program and 18F, one of the strategic aims is to "bring best-of-class, private-sector engineers into government for time-limited tours of duty," and task them with bringing a modern perspective to key technology initiatives. Similar to 18F, many PIF alumni have stayed on to help staff the USDS.

=== White House Fellows ===
In terms of extreme selectiveness, the Presidential Innovation Fellows program is similar to the White House Fellows program. In addition, both are non-partisan programs. However, the White House Fellows program is focused on preparing future national leaders using special assistant roles to top-ranking government officials. In contrast, the Presidential Innovation Fellows are tasked with leading highly accelerated tactical and technical projects, with many of the projects rapidly delivering new functioning systems, processes, and software applications using principles derived from Lean Startup methodology. Organizationally, White House Fellows are presidential appointees administered through the White House Office. The program established by President Lyndon Johnson in 1964.

=== Presidential Management Fellows ===
The PIF program is distinct and separate from the Presidential Management Fellows Program, the latter of which focused primarily on recruiting recent graduates as citizen-scholars as a pathway to long-term Federal careers until its termination in 2025. Presidential Management Fellows were administered via the U.S. Office of Personnel Management. The Presidential Management Fellows Program was initially established as the Presidential Management Intern Program in 1977.

=== White House Leadership Development Program Fellows ===
The White House Leadership Development Program is designed to provide senior level federal employees (GS-15 and equivalent) with exposure to cross-agency priority challenges. It was established by President Barack Obama on December 9, 2014. The program is sponsored by the Executive Office of the President and is administered by the General Services Administration.

=== HHS Entrepreneurs ===
In the same year that the Presidential Innovation Fellows program was founded, the Department of Health and Human Services created its HHS Entrepreneurs program (originally known as HHS Innovation Fellows), which is different in structure and focus, but also aims to incorporate external ideas and expertise into HHS's own innovation processes.

== TALENT Act and Presidential Executive Order ==
On August 20, 2015, President Barack Obama issued an executive order institutionalizing the Presidential Innovation Fellows program as an ongoing part of the U.S. Federal Government. “What began as an experiment is becoming a success. That’s why I’m making it permanent. From now on, Presidential Innovation Fellows will be an integral part of our government.”

In 2017, the bipartisan TALENT Act introduced by Kevin McCarthy was passed by Congress, making permanent the PIF program.

== Alumni ==
The Presidential Innovation Fellows Foundation, a non-government non-profit organization, was formally incorporated in 2014. It exists to serve as an alumni group for all former Presidential Innovation Fellows (PIF) and to serve as the fiduciary agent for non-governmental contributions for the support of the PIF program. The purposes include: furthering the mission of the Presidential Innovation Fellows program of bringing the principles, values, and practices of the innovation economy into government in order to tackle the Nation's biggest challenges and to achieve a profound and lasting social impact; providing a conduit for nongovernmental support of the PIF program and its mission; and serving as an alumni association for PIF fellows, providing an avenue for PIF fellows and their networks to continue contributing to solving challenges of national concern.

Some alumni of the program have gone on to other innovation roles, primarily in technology-related areas, in both the private sector as well as in public sector roles at federal, state and local levels, as well as advisory roles such as sharing scientific and technical expertise at President's Council of Advisors on Science and Technology (PCAST) workshops.

== Notable fellows ==
=== 2012 ===
- Ryan Panchadsaram - Deputy CTO of the United States

=== 2013 ===
- Sarah Allen
- Scott Hartley
- Geoff Mulligan
- Beverly Park Woolf
- Hillary Hartley - Co-founder, 18F; Chief Digital and Data Officer, Ontario
- Aaron Snow - Co-founder, 18F; CEO, Canadian Digital Service
- Greg Godbout Co-founder, 18F; Chief Technology Officer, Environmental Protection Agency

=== 2014 ===
- Dan Hammer

=== 2016 ===
- Michael Brown
- Olivier Kamanda
