= 10x (innovation program) =

Digital service provided by the United States Government

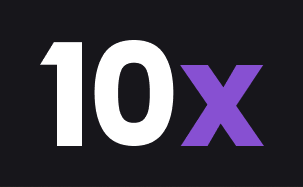
- Founded: 2015
- Area served: U.S. government
- Owners: General Services Administration (GSA); Technology Transformation Services (TTS)
- Services: Innovation studio
- Website: 10x.gsa.gov
- Commercial: No

10x is an innovation program within the Technology Transformation Services (TTS) department in the United States General Services Administration (GSA). 10x collects suggestions from federal employees on new technology to build within the United States federal government. Government services which began as 10x ideas include Login.gov, Notify.gov, and the U.S. Web Design System.

== Concept ==
10x solicits ideas for problems and solutions from federal employees to issues they have experienced in their work or life related to the government. Selected ideas go through up to four phases of investigation and experimentation. It is similar to a business incubator for public services.

== Experiments with artificial intelligence ==
In 2024, roughly one fifth of the ideas 10x received were related to artificial intelligence (AI). One such idea, the 10x AI sandbox, created during the Biden administration, was rebranded to GSAi by DOGE allies.

== See also ==
- Civic technology
- Service design
- 18F
- Technology Transformation Services
