= United States Digital Corps =

United States government fellowship program

Agency overview
- Formed: August 2021; 5 years ago
- Parent department: Technology Transformation Services, General Services Administration
- Website: digitalcorps.gsa.gov

The United States Digital Corps (USDC) is a federal fellowship program, housed within the General Services Administration's Technology Transformation Services department, that places early-career technologists into positions across various government agencies. The program seeks to engage young tech talent in government work, as well as to modernize government software and digital design. USDC has been operating two-year fellowships since 2022, and offers fellows an opportunity for permanent civil service roles upon completion of the program.

== History ==
The USDC was launched on August 30, 2021, as a collaboration between multiple federal agencies including the General Services Administration, the White House Office of Management and Budget, the Office of Personnel Management, the Cybersecurity and Infrastructure Security Agency, and the White House Office of Science and Technology Policy. The origin of the idea for a federal 'digital corps' came from the Federation of American Scientists' Day One Project.

USDC was one of the programs named in the National AI Talent Surge, initiated by President Biden's 2023 Executive Order on Safe, Secure, and Trustworthy Development and Use of Artificial Intelligence.

== USDC activities ==
Over the program's lifetime, USDC has hired over 100 Fellows as part of three cohorts: 40 fellows in 2022, 48 fellows in 2023, and 70 fellows in 2024. These fellows have been placed in 20 federal agencies including the General Services Administration, Office of Management and Budget, Office of Personnel Management, Cybersecurity and Infrastructure Security Agency, Department of Veterans Affairs, and Centers for Medicare and Medicaid Services. There was no 2025 cohort due to the federal hiring freeze. The program is competitive; the 70 fellows in the 2024 cohort were selected from over 2,000 applications.

USDC projects include:

- Creating a content management system for Vote.gov
- Leveraging data to support 222 Nicaraguan political prisoners released to the US in 2023
- Enabling American diplomats abroad to access messaging apps securely from their computers, in addition to mobile devices
- Building a registrar within CISA for requesting and managing .gov domains
- Co-founding the Digital Service team within the Administration for Children and Families
- Assisting the creation of the Health+ Long COVID Report
- Designing FindSupport.gov, a website with resources for those struggling with mental health or substance use, for the Substance Abuse and Mental Health Services Administration

=== Awards and recognitions ===
The program and its leadership have received various awards and recognitions for innovative government work, including the 2022 FedScoop "Innovation of the Year" award, the 2023 Nextgov Rising Star award, the 2024 Nextgov Federal 100, and the 2024 and 2025 FedScoop "Most Inspiring Up & Comer" award.

== See also ==
- United States Digital Service
- Presidential Management Fellows Program
- Presidential Innovation Fellows
- 18F, at the General Services Administration
- United Kingdom Government Digital Service
