= Sam Corcos =

American entrepreneur and government official

Chief information officer of the United States Department of the Treasury and Acting in various positions at the General Services Administration

Personal details
- Education: Claremont McKenna College (economics)
- Occupation: Entrepreneur, government official
- Known for: Co-founder of Levels

Sam Corcos is an American technology entrepreneur and government official. He co-founded and was chief executive officer of Levels, a metabolic health company built around continuous glucose monitoring. In 2025 he joined the US government as an associate within the Department of Government Efficiency (DOGE) to support United States Department of the Treasury as a special advisor and chief information officer. In 2026 he also took on three acting leadership roles at the General Services Administration.

== Early life and education ==
Corcos graduated from Claremont McKenna College with a degree in economics.

== Career ==
=== Levels ===
Corcos co-founded Levels in 2019 with Casey Means, Josh Clemente, David Flinner and Andrew Conner, and served as its CEO. The company pairs continuous glucose monitors with software that shows users how food affects their blood sugar; it later added blood testing and access to nutritionists. Investors included Andreessen Horowitz, Trust Ventures and Shrug Capital.

=== U.S. Treasury and DOGE ===
Corcos joined the Treasury Department as a special adviser in March 2025, as part of DOGE. In April 2025 Wired reported that he was one of two DOGE staff organizing an IRS hackathon to build a single API for taxpayer data, which he reportedly called "one new API to rule them all." The proposed API would have covered names, addresses, Social Security numbers, tax returns and employment data, and Palantir was discussed as a possible vendor. An IRS employee described the plan as "basically an open door controlled by Elon Musk for all Americans' most sensitive information with none of the rules that normally secure that data."

In May 2025 Corcos became Treasury's chief information officer. His appointment came as the acting CIO, chief technology officer and chief information security officer were also set to leave, and after the IRS had cut about 50 IT executives. Treasury later announced him as Deputy Assistant Secretary for Information Systems and Chief Information Officer.

In June 2025 The Nation reported that Corcos had left blank the section on his wife's assets and income in his February 2025 financial disclosure. He later filed an amended disclosure adding her investment in Sana Health, a medical device company with a Defense Department grant.

In October 2025 Corcos defended layoffs at the IRS, calling them "a really painful process" but necessary to reorganize the agency's technology operations. About 1,300 of the Treasury Department's recent layoff notices had gone to IRS employees, and the agency had lost about 2,000 IT workers that year.

In September 2026 Politico reported that Treasury Secretary Scott Bessent had removed Corcos from artificial intelligence policy work earlier that summer. According to the report, Corcos had held conversations with executives at OpenAI and Anthropic without informing the White House, presenting himself as an industry ally and warning that other officials sought burdensome licensing rules. A Treasury spokesperson said Corcos "remains involved in providing policy guidance on issues within his area of expertise."

=== General Services Administration ===
In August 2026, while remaining Treasury CIO, Corcos took on three acting roles at the GSA:

- Director of Technology Transformation Services
- Deputy Commissioner of the Federal Acquisition Service
- Assistant Commissioner for Login.gov

In September 2026 Corcos appointed Ryan Parker, a Treasury AI engineer, to lead the U.S. Web Design System (USWDS) after its longtime head, Anne Petersen, was placed on administrative leave. USWDS team members then lost access to the project's GitHub repository, while Parker and Corcos began changing it. Critics objected to deleted GitHub comments and the use of AI tools to approve changes without community review, warning of risks to federal accessibility (Section 508) compliance. Nearly 200 technologists began building an independent copy of the system.

In October 2026, Justin Adelman, a U.S. Tech Force fellow and Treasury engineer, was detailed to both the GSA and the White House's National Design Studio (NDS) as an SI Engineer working on America.gov. America.gov, a joint GSA–NDS project, was launched in September 2026.

In November 2026, Corcos identified Adelman as leading GSA's work on America.gov under his oversight. That month, Corcos also required Technology Transformation Services employees to submit daily emails detailing completed work, plans and obstacles by 6 p.m. local time, warning that failure to comply could result in adverse action. Adelman was assigned to help address reported obstacles.
