= USDC =

USDC or US-DC may refer to:

- United States Department of Commerce
- United States Diplomacy Center
- United States district court
- United States Digital Corps
- Universal Scene Description, .usdc (binary-encoded) file format
- Ultrasonic/sonic driller/corer
- USDC (cryptocurrency), a stablecoin cryptocurrency
- US-DC, the ISO 3166 code for Washington, D.C.
