= National Strategy for Trusted Identities in Cyberspace =

The National Strategy for Trusted Identities in Cyberspace (NSTIC) is a US government initiative announced in April 2011 to improve the privacy, security and convenience of sensitive online transactions through collaborative efforts with the private sector, advocacy groups, government agencies, and other organizations.

The strategy imagined an online environment where individuals and organizations can trust each other because they identify and authenticate their digital identities and the digital identities of organizations and devices. It was promoted to offer, but not mandate, stronger identification and authentication while protecting privacy by limiting the amount of information that individuals must disclose.

== Description ==
The strategy was developed with input from private sector lobbyists, including organizations representing 18 business groups, 70 nonprofit and federal advisory groups, and comments and dialogue from the public.

The strategy had four guiding principles:

1. privacy-enhancing and voluntary
2. secure and resilient
3. interoperable
4. cost-effective and easy to use.

The NSTIC described a vision compared to an ecosystem where individuals, businesses, and other organizations enjoy greater trust and security as they conduct sensitive transactions online. Technologies, policies, and agreed upon standards would securely support transactions ranging from anonymous to fully authenticated and from low to high value in such an imagined world. Implementation included three initiatives:

- The Identity Ecosystem Steering Group (IDESG), the private sector-led organization developing the Identity Ecosystem Framework;
- Funding pilot projects that NSTIC said embrace and advance guiding principles; and
- The Federal Cloud Credential Exchange (FCCX), the U.S. federal government service for government agencies to accept third-party issued credentials approved under the FICAM scheme.

NSTIC was announced during the presidency of Barack Obama near the end of his first term on April 15, 2011. A magazine article said individuals might validate their identities securely for sensitive transactions (such as banking or viewing health records) and let them stay anonymous when they are not (such as blogging or surfing the Web).

In January 2011, the U.S. Department of Commerce had established a National Program Office (NPO), led by the National Institute of Standards and Technology, to help implement NSTIC. To coordinate implementation activities of federal agencies, the NPO works with the White House Cybersecurity Coordinator, originally Howard Schmidt, and then after 2012 Michael Daniel.

== Steering group ==
The NSTIC called a steering group led by the private sector to administer the development and adoption of its framework. This Identity Ecosystem Steering Group (IDESG) held a meeting in Chicago August 15–16, 2012. The meeting brought together 195 members in person and 315 members remotely. Additional plenary meetings were in Phoenix, Arizona, Santa Clara, California, and Boston, Massachusetts. Under a grant from 2012 through 2014, Trusted Federal Systems, Inc. was the group's administrative body.

== Pilots ==
The federal government initiated and supported pilot programs. In 2012, NSTIC awarded $9 million to pilot projects in the first year. For example, the American Association of Motor Vehicle Administrators was developing a demonstration of commercial identity provider credentials by the Virginia state government, including securely verifying identities online with the Virginia Department of Motor Vehicles. The Internet2 received about $1.8 million for research. ID.me was given a two-year grant in 2013.

Further work funded by NIST is on their Trusted Identities Group Web Page.

== Federal Cloud Credential Exchange ==
The NSTIC called for U.S. federal government agencies to be early adopters of the Identity Ecosystem envisioned in NSTIC. Agencies struggled to implement it for services they provide internally and externally. Technical, policy and cost barriers made it challenging to accept third-party credential providers accredited by the Federal Identity, Credential, and Access Management (FICAM) initiative.

In response, the White House created a Federal Cloud Credential Exchange (FCCX) team, co-chaired by NSTIC and the General Services Administration. The team consisted of representatives from agencies whose applications are accessed by a large population of external customers. In November 2012, the United States Postal Service was chosen to manage a pilot version of the FCCX, and awarded the contract to build it to SecureKey Technologies, a member of FIDO Alliance. That contract was renewed in May 2015.

=== Connect.gov ===
Connect.gov was launched in December 2014, the manifestation of this pilot. The first two companies to provide individual US citizens Identity Management services compatible with Connect.gov, were ID.me and Verizon. Ping Identity and Forgerock were the first software platforms to provide FICAM-compliant credentials, and enable private sector organizations to connect securely to government agencies, a primary objective of this project.

=== Login.gov ===
On May 10, 2016, 18F announced in a blog entry that Connect.gov would be replaced. The replacement system would be called Login.gov, and launched in April 2017.

== Identity Ecosystem Steering Group ==
The Identity Ecosystem Steering Group (IDESG) received start up funding from NIST in 2010 and has since created a series of documents that is available on their website. In 2016, they introduced the Identity Ecosystem Framework (IDEF) Registry for self-assessment.

== Criticism ==
The proposal generated criticism since it was released in draft form in June 2010. Much centered around privacy implications of the proposal.

Shortly after the draft's release, the Electronic Privacy Information Center (EPIC), with other consumer-rights and civil liberties organizations, sent the committee a statement in response to the draft NSTIC policy, requesting a clearer and more complete plan to create and safeguard Internet users' rights and privacy. While EPIC head, Marc Rotenberg, called NSTIC "historic," he also cautioned that "...online identity is a complex problem and the risk of 'cyber-identity theft' with consolidated identity systems is very real. The US will need to do more to protect online privacy."

NSTIC addressed some early privacy concerns through its 2013 fair information practice principles document. Subsequent initiatives sought to advance privacy. For example, the American Civil Liberties Union and the Electronic Frontier Foundation were involved in a privacy committee in the IDESG.
