= Mina Hsiang =

American engineer and product executive

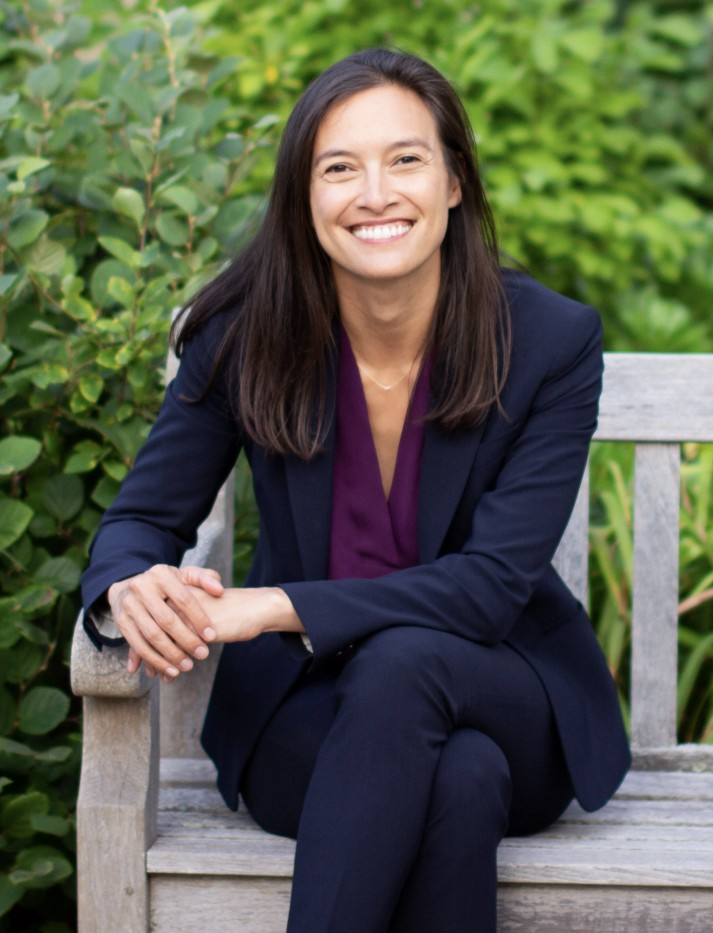
- Photograph of Hsiang used by the USDS during her time as Administrator

Administrator of the United States Digital Service
- In office September 2, 2021 – January 20, 2025
- President: Joe Biden
- Preceded by: Matt Cutts
- Succeeded by: Amy Gleason (as the United States DOGE Service)

Personal details
- Born: 1980 or 1981 (age 45–46)
- Education: Massachusetts Institute of Technology (BS, ME); Harvard University (MBA)

Mina Hsiang (born 1980 or 1981) is an American engineer and product executive. She was the third administrator of the United States Digital Service in the Executive Office of the President of the United States. Hsiang was on the original rescue team for Healthcare.gov.

== Education ==
Hsiang received a Bachelor of Science and Master of Engineering in electrical engineering from the Massachusetts Institute of Technology (MIT) and an M.B.A. from Harvard Business School.

== Career ==
Hsiang's experience ranges across startups, venture capital, consulting and government. In her early career, Hsiang worked on healthcare projects in rural Malawi for the Clinton Foundation and in the prosthetics program with DEKA Research & Development Corporation. She helped start two companies in her role at General Catalyst Partners. She also served as the Vice President of Market Strategy for Optum Analytics. After leaving Optum, she joined the federal government as a member of the team that helped improve the Healthcare.gov website. Afterwards, Hsiang was a tech lead for the Precision Medicine Initiative. She was the founding executive director of the Digital Service at Health and Human Services. After leaving the federal government, she helped build Devoted Health as its Vice President of New Market Development.

In 2021, she was named the third administrator of the United States Digital Service. Hsiang is the first woman and first Asian American to be the administrator of the United States Digital Service.

Hsiang received a waiver that allowed her to hold on to her stock portfolio while serving in her leadership role in government. Hsiang owned shares of Rebellion Defense, an artificial intelligence defense company, which she disclosed to the federal government. Hsiang sold the shares three weeks after being appointed administrator of the United States Digital Service, which was within the required deadline to do so. In 2022, the Project on Government Oversight raised questions about the propriety of her stock holdings. In 2022, the U.S. Department of Defense made two purchases from Rebellion Defense totaling $225,000.
