= Thomas Shedd =

Adviser to US government

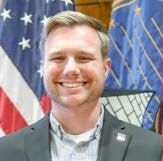
Portrait of Thomas Shedd

Thomas Shedd was the director of the Technology Transformation Services (TTS) and the Federal Acquisition Service Deputy Commissioner for the General Services Administration (GSA) and was chief information officer at the Department of Labor (DOL). During his time heading TTS, Shedd oversaw a large scale reduction of the TTS workforce, including the elimination of the digital transformation agency 18F.

== Background ==
Shedd studied mechanical and aerospace engineering at UC Davis.

Prior to becoming director of TTS, Thomas Shedd was a mechanical engineer and software developer for Tesla for eight years. He built software for Tesla vehicle and battery factories.

== Career at second Trump administration ==
=== Technology Transformation Service (TTS) ===
In January 2025, Shedd was appointed by the Trump administration to lead TTS. Upon assuming the role, Shedd outlined an "AI-first strategy" to automate tasks and his goal to create a central data repository for all federal government. In an all-hands meeting with the Technology Transformation Services (TTS) in early February, Shedd told 18F and TTS staff that "you all are one of the most respected technology groups in the federal government," saying the staff "are so key and critical to this next phase" of building federal software.

Shedd reportedly requested admin access to TTS systems, leading to the resignation of a Notify.gov engineer who cited concern around inappropriate access to the data contained with the system.

In February 2025, Shedd oversaw reductions in staff at TTS through the deferred resignation program, the reduction in force of probationary staff, and the elimination of the entire 18F organization. In March, Shedd told TTS employees that 50% of the TTS workforce will be eliminated in planned reductions, while also asking for technical wins to prove value to DOGE leadership. Fast Company stated that under Shedd's leadership, TTS is "losing people, projects, and purpose."

Shedd was replaced as head of TTS by Greg Barbaccia on February 19, 2026. It was announced he remains with GSA "as senior advisor for fraud prevention" and in July 2026, GSA employee stated that he has remained at the agency as a special government employee despite no longer holding an official role there.

=== Department of Labor (DOL) ===
Less than two months after becoming director of TTS, Shedd reportedly also began working as chief information officer at the Department of Labor, overseeing 27 agencies within the department. Shedd departed DOL on August 4, according to NextGov, after having cut 20% of DOL's staff overall and 40% of technology staff. In spite of the cuts, reporting indicates no savings were realized, quoting an employee's explanation: "Most of that effort is spent on educating [Shedd] instead of trusting seasoned technical staff or setting clear budget goals managers can prioritize [their] work around."

== Conflicts of Interest ==
Shedd is serving at GSA and DOL while on an unpaid leave of absence from Tesla, which ethics experts describe as highly unusual and creating a conflict of interest.

== See also ==
- Technology Transformation Services
- Department of Government Efficiency
