= Clare Martorana =

American government official

Clare A. Martorana
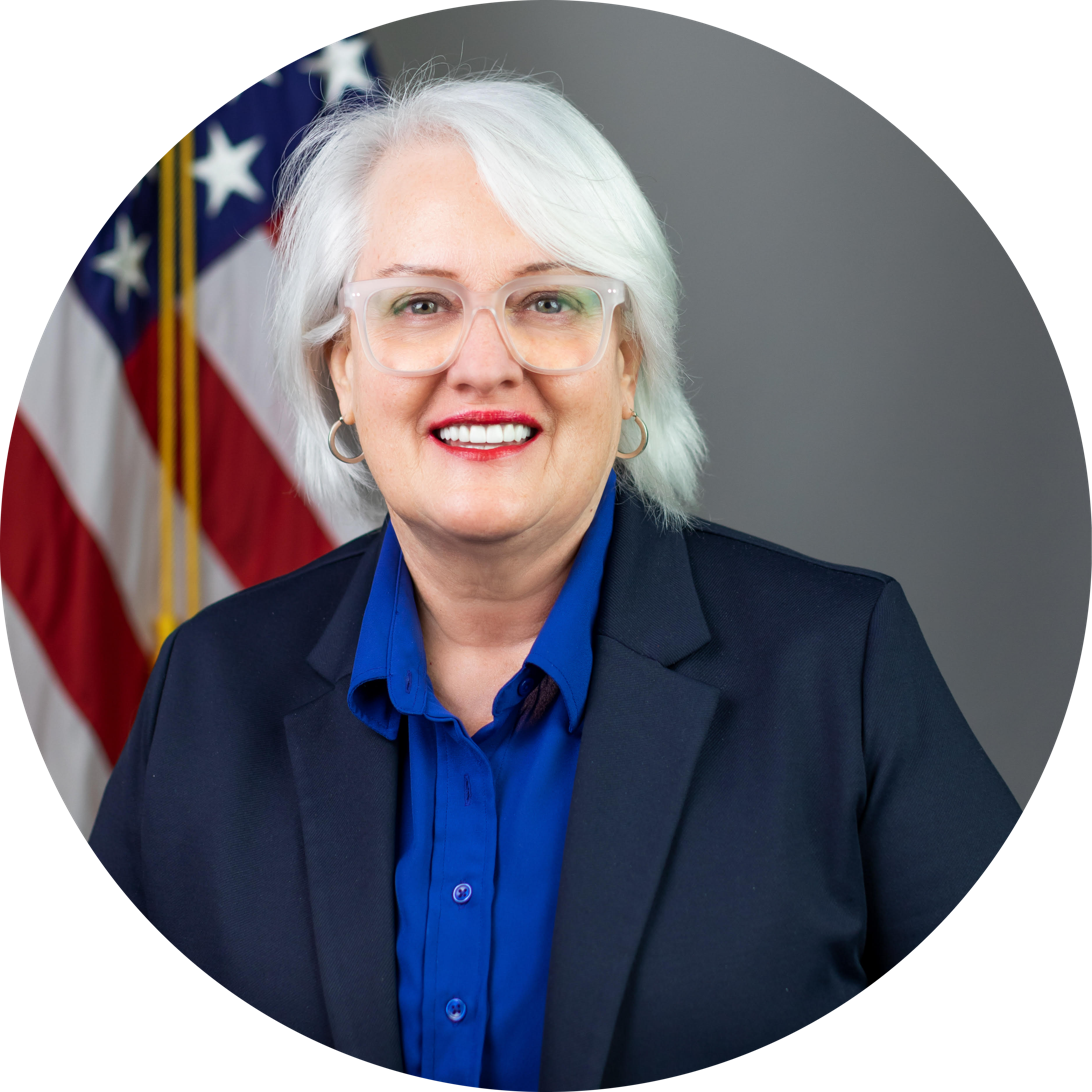

5th Chief Information Officer of the United States
- In office March 2021 – January 2025
- President: Joe Biden
- Preceded by: Suzette Kent
- Succeeded by: Greg Barbaccia

Personal details
- Education: Saint Elizabeth University

Clare A. Martorana is an American technology executive who served as Federal Chief Information Officer of the United States in the Biden administration from March 2021 until January 2025. She was the fifth person to hold the job of Federal CIO, which was created by the E-Government Act of 2002. The Federal CIO's office is a part of the Office of Management and Budget (OMB).

== Career ==
Prior to a career in public service, Martorana was President at Everyday Health and held a variety of executive roles across the WebMD corporation.

Martorana joined the U.S. Digital Service team at the U.S. Department of Veterans Affairs in the year 2016, establishing the agency’s digital modernization work to deliver veterans a modern digital experience on the agency's web platforms. In 2019, she took on the role of the Chief Information Officer at the Office of Personnel Management (OPM). At OPM, Martorana managed the agency's technology enterprise as it rebuilt from the 2015 hacks involving the agency's security documents.

=== Federal CIO ===
President Biden appointed Martorana into the CIO role in March 2021. The role involved working on response to then 2020 SolarWinds hack, increasing overall customer experience across government, implementing zero trust architecture patterns, and setting rules for the adoption of artificial intelligence by federal agencies. She departed the role in January 2025 prior to the inauguration of President Trump.
