= Olivier Kamanda =

American journalist

Olivier Kamanda is a Product Manager at Google focusing on content moderation. He previously served as director of learning and impact strategy at the John S. and James L. Knight Foundation. He is a former Presidential Innovation Fellow and previously served as speechwriter and senior advisor to Secretary of State Hillary Clinton.

== Education ==
He obtained a Bachelor of Science degree from Princeton University in 2003 and his Juris Doctor from the University of Pennsylvania Law School in 2009. It was during his third year at Penn Law that he founded the Foreign Policy Digest. Also while in law school, he was executive editor of the school's Journal of International Law and a columnist for The Huffington Post.

== Career ==
Olivier Kamanda has held various positions in media, law, and public service.

Early in his career, Kamanda was a Trustee of Princeton University and served as president of the Montgomery County Young Democrats from 2004 to 2006. He was also the founding editor-in-chief of Foreign Policy Digest.

In 2011, Washington Life Magazine named Kamanda one of Washington, D.C.'s "Most Influential Leaders Under 40."

In 2015, Kamanda founded Ideal Impact, an application designed to connect news readers with volunteer opportunities. This project received support through the Halcyon Incubator program.

Kamanda continues his involvement in public service as a fellow with the Truman National Security Project and has been recognized as a Young Leader by the French American Foundation. He serves on the Board of Directors of the Center for Public Integrity and as Vice Chair of the Board of Trustees at Landon School.

== Personal life ==
Kamanda is the son of Gérard Kamanda wa Kamanda, former Foreign Minister of Zaire (now Democratic Republic of the Congo).
