= Gregory Barbaccia =

American intelligence officer

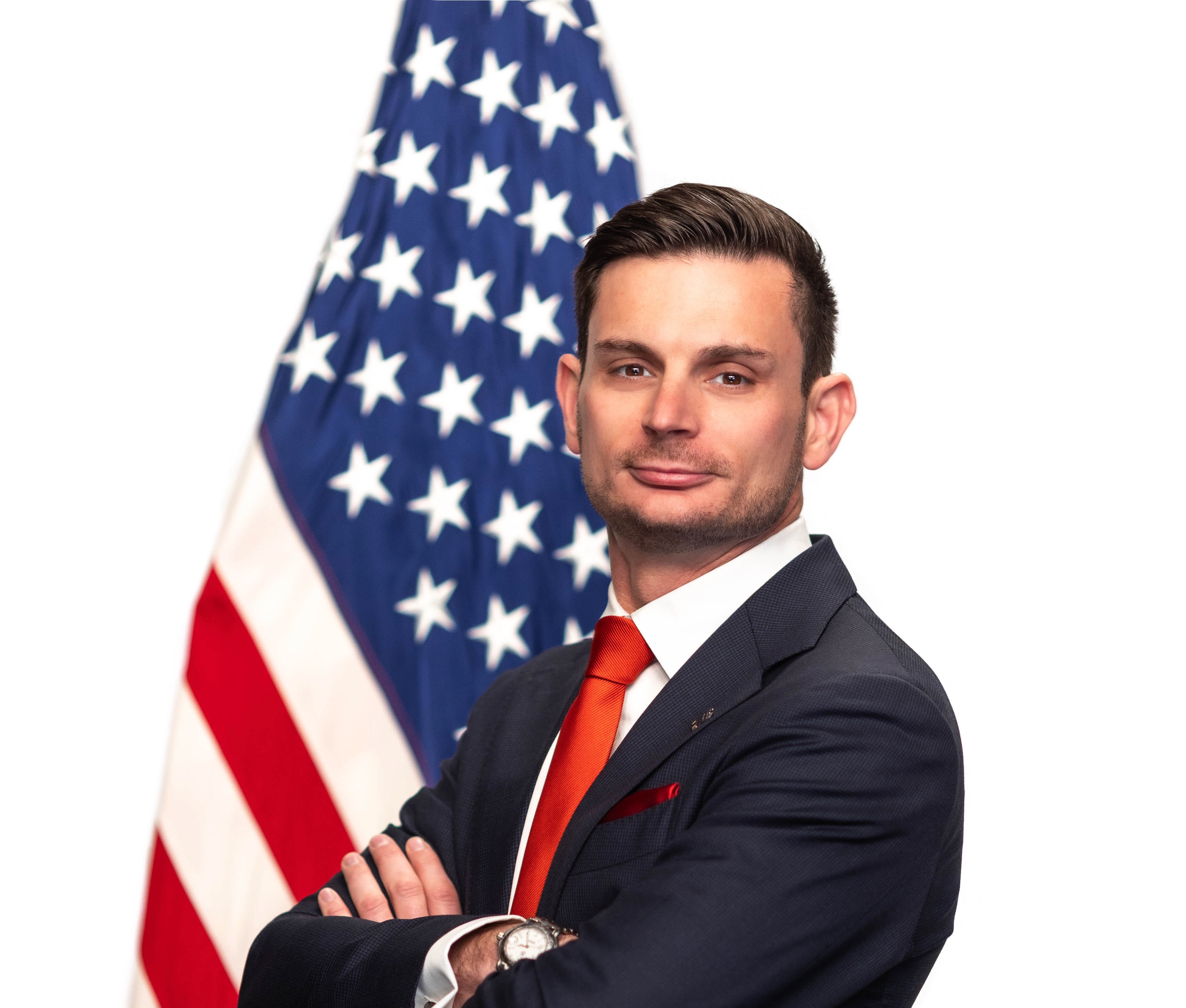

Federal Chief Information Officer of the United States
- Incumbent
- Assumed office January 27, 2025
- President: Donald Trump
- Deputy: Drew Myklegard; Thomas Flagg
- Preceded by: Clare Martorana

Acting Director of Technology Transformation Services
- Incumbent
- Assumed office February 19, 2026
- President: Donald Trump
- Preceded by: Thomas Shedd

Federal Government Service Delivery Lead
- Incumbent
- Assumed office September 5, 2025
- President: Donald Trump
- Preceded by: Position established

Federal Chief Artificial Intelligence Officer
- Incumbent
- Assumed office July 2025
- President: Donald Trump
- Preceded by: Position established

Military service
- Branch/service: United States Army
- Years of service: 2004–2008
- Rank: Sergeant

Gregory Barbaccia is an American intelligence officer who has served as the federal chief information officer of the United States since January 2025. Barbaccia has additionally served as the federal chief artificial intelligence officer since July 2025, the federal government service delivery lead since September 2025, and the acting director of Technology Transformation Services since February 2026.

Barbaccia began working as a civilian intelligence analyst in the United States Army in 2003. He enlisted the following year and became an intelligence sergeant. In 2008, Barbaccia became an intelligence analyst in the United States Intelligence Community. In 2010, he joined Palantir and became its head of intelligence and investigations in 2017. Barbaccia left Palantir in 2020 to become the president and head of investigations of Elementus, a Web3 company, and the chief information security officer of Theorem, a credit underwriting company.

In January 2025, President Donald Trump named Barbaccia as the federal chief information officer of the United States. He later became the federal chief artificial intelligence officer, the federal government service delivery lead, and the acting director of Technology Transformation Services.

== Career ==
=== Intelligence work (2003–2009) ===
In 2003, Barbaccia became a civilian intelligence analyst for the United States Army. The following year, he enlisted in the Army and became an intelligence sergeant. Barbaccia left the Army in 2008 to work as an intelligence analyst in the United States Intelligence Community.

=== Work with Palantir and other private sector companies (2010–2025) ===
In 2010, Barbaccia joined Palantir as a government account manager. According to his LinkedIn profile, Barbaccia founded a contracting firm that offered field service representation for Palantir's initial clients prior to joining the company. He worked as a core operations lead and a security lead at Palantir. In 2017, Barbaccia became the head of intelligence and investigations. In 2020, he left Palantir to become the president of Elementus, a blockchain intelligence firm and Web3 company. Barbaccia became its head of investigations in June. He began working for Theorem, a credit underwriting company, as its chief information security officer in August 2022.

=== Federal Chief Information Officer under the Trump administration (2025–present) ===
On January 24, 2025, Barbaccia announced on LinkedIn that President Donald Trump had named him as the federal chief information officer of the United States. He began serving in the position on January 27. After his appointment, Barbaccia sought to revise federal hiring, procurement, and security policies. In March, he sent an email to federal chief information officers requesting an audit of their federal contracts with Microsoft, Adobe, Salesforce, Oracle, and ServiceNow.

In July 2025, Barbaccia began referring to himself as the federal chief artificial intelligence officer. In September, he became the federal government service delivery lead. In February 2026, Barbaccia was named as the acting director of Technology Transformation Services and an advisor to Edward Forst, the administrator of general services. In July 2026, it was announced that Barbaccia is leaving the federal government by the end of August.
