= Florida Digital Service =

Cybersecurity agency in Florida, United States

Agency overview
- Formed: 2020
- Jurisdiction: Florida
- Headquarters: 605 Suwannee Street, Tallahassee, Florida, U.S.
- Parent agency: Florida Department of Management Services
- Website: digital.fl.gov

The Florida Digital Service is a government agency created to lead Florida's cybersecurity efforts. In 2020, the agency, modeled after the United States Digital Service, was created by Ron DeSantis based on legislation introduced by Florida Rep. James Grant, who initially led the organization. The Florida Department of Management Services is the parent agency.

In 2021, several top officials departed without giving any notice and the agency, short-staffed, was unable to create a plan to spend the $30 million in funding assigned to cybersecurity measures by lawmakers. By September 2022 only 40 of 70 full-time positions were filled. Grant announced he would step down from the role of Chief Information Officer on July 1, 2023. In April 2024, a law revised the purpose of the agency to be "to lead enterprise information technology and cybersecurity efforts." In August 2024, Warren Sponholtz was named the new Chief Information Officer.

State Senate Bill 7026, introduced in March 2025, would replace the Florida Digital Service (FDS) with a cabinet-level entity known as the Agency for State Systems and Enterprise Technology. The new agency is intended to serve as the enterprise agency for IT governance and is projected to be established by 2028, contingent on the bill's passage. The bill was presented to the Florida Senate Appropriations Committee on March 17 by State Senator Gayle Harrell and was subsequently referred to the full Senate.
