= Premier of Ontario =

Head of government of Ontario

- Premier ministre de l'Ontario
- Coat of arms of Ontario

- Flag of Ontario

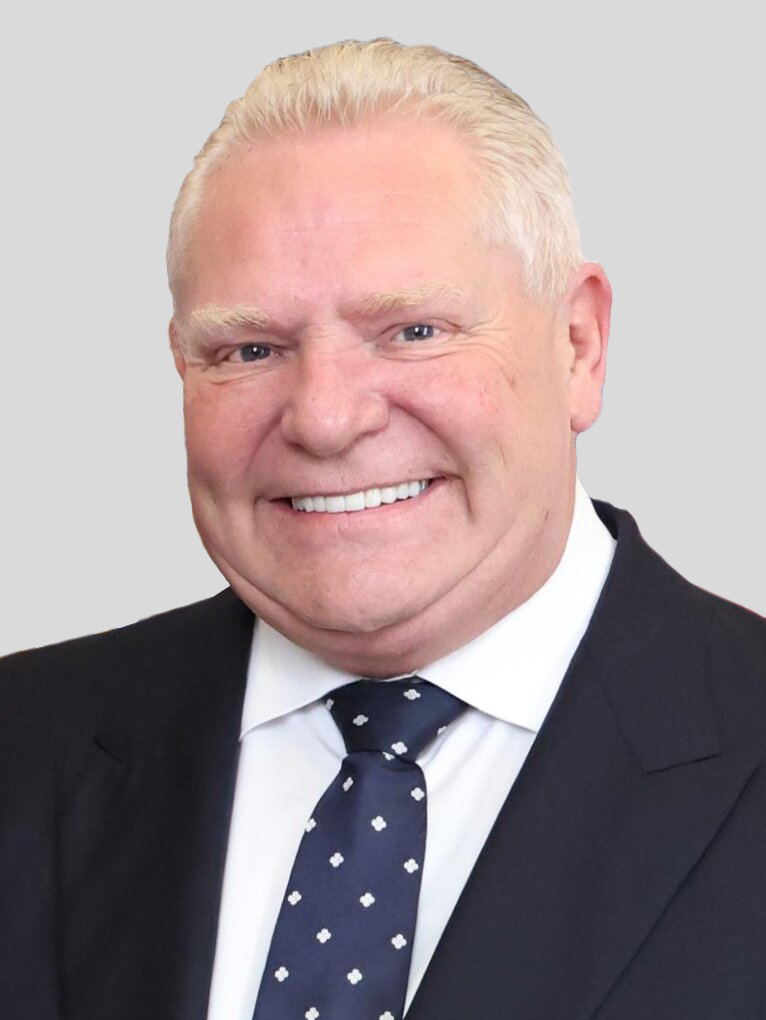
- Incumbent; Doug Ford since June 29, 2018
- Government of Ontario
- Style: The Honourable (formal); Premier (informal)
- Status: Head of government
- Member of: Executive Council
- Reports to: Legislative Assembly; Lieutenant Governor
- Seat: Queen's Park, Toronto
- Appointer: Lieutenant Governor of Ontario; with the confidence of the Legislative Assembly
- Term length: At His Majesty's pleasure; contingent on the premier's ability to command confidence in the legislative assembly
- Formation: July 16, 1867 (159 years ago)
- First holder: John Sandfield Macdonald
- Deputy: Deputy Premier of Ontario
- Salary: $292,752 (2026)
- Website: www.ontario.ca/premier

The premier of Ontario (French: premier ministre de l'Ontario) (Note: When the position is held by a woman, the French title is première ministre de l'Ontario) is the head of government of Ontario. Under the Westminster system, the premier governs with the confidence of a majority of the elected Legislative Assembly; as such, the premier typically sits as a member of Provincial Parliament (MPP) and leads the largest party or a coalition of parties. As first minister, the premier selects ministers to form the Executive Council (provincial cabinet), and serves as its chair. Constitutionally, the Crown exercises executive power on the advice of the Executive Council, which is collectively responsible to the legislature.

Doug Ford is the 26th and current premier of Ontario. He took office on June 29, 2018, following the 2018 Ontario election where his Progressive Conservative (PC) party won a majority of seats in the Ontario Legislature.

== History ==
The position of Ontario premier evolved from the role of Joint Premier of Canada for Canada West, with John Sandfield Macdonald, the second-last joint premier of Canada becoming the first prime minister of the province of Ontario, a position that later was renamed to "Premier".

Section 63 of the British North America Act, 1867 established the Executive Council for Ontario (and Quebec) and specifically created five executive offices: the attorney general, the treasurer, the secretary and registrar, the commissioner of Crown Lands, and the commissioner of agriculture and public works. However, it made no specific mention of, or provision for, the premier or premier's office. Until 1905, it was customary for the leader of the governing party to occupy the office of the attorney general. That was the case for 32 of the province's first 38 years.

The first person to lead the province's administration was John Sandfield Macdonald. A reformer (i.e. Liberal) prior to confederation, he replaced John A Macdonald as co-premier of the Province of Canada in 1862, leading a Liberal administration for two years. He was elected to the first Canadian parliament as the Liberal MP for Cornwall. However, he quickly became an ally to Prime Minister John A Macdonald, who manoeuvred him into the premier's chair by providing him the support of the Conservative members. In the first five years of confederation, politicians were allowed to hold "dual mandates", serving simultaneously in the House of Commons and in a provincial legislature. This created a unique situation where Sandfield Macdonald was the head of a coalition government that consisted of mostly conservatives in Toronto, while sitting as an opposition Liberal MP in Ottawa with a number of the Liberals in opposition to his government. Following the conservatives' defeat in the provincial election held in March 1871, he initially ignored a non-confidence vote and refused to resign until December.

Having finally ousted Macdonald, Liberal Edward Blake, the second premier, remained in office for less than a year. With dual mandates outlawed, Blake opted to lead the Liberals in Ottawa and handed the reign in Toronto to Oliver Mowat, who would become the longest serving Premier and Attorney General of Ontario, serving almost 24 years between 1872 and 1896.

Conservative James Whitney ended more than 30 years of Liberals rules and became premier in 1905. Through legislation he amended the Executive Council Act to add a separate office of the president of the executive council. A separate expense line was also added to provide budget for a "Premier and President of Executive Council Department" that year. The department was further renamed in 1907 to "Office of the Prime Minister and President of the Council". The department was responsible for providing administrative support to the prime minister of Ontario, and was one of the smallest agencies of the Ontario Government, consisting of just two chief clerks (one for the premier and one for the executive council), one assistant clerk and a stenographer.

The term "Prime Minister of Ontario" remained in colloquial use until the government of Bill Davis formal adopted the usage of the term Premier in 1971, and legally changed the title in 1983. However, in French the prime minister–premier distinction does not exist, the premier is still referred to as premier ministre (masculine) or première ministre (feminine). This directly translates to 'first minister' or 'prime minister' in English, with both the federal and provincial first ministers being styled the same way.

Ontario political trends have been noted as running opposite to the trends of the federal government, with the premier and the prime minister usually coming from different types of parties. For example, in the 21st century, the federal and provincial liberal parties were only jointly in power from 2003 to 2005 and 2015 to 2018, or approximately 5 years out of 21 years cumulatively, and there was no overlap between federal and provincial conservative parties. This trend has held strongly since approximately 1950, despite Ontario being the largest province in Canada.

Most premiers have taken office between the ages of 40 and 60. With the exception of Thomas Laird Kennedy, who was 70 when he served less than a year as an interim party leader, the last premier to become premier outside of the 40-60 age range was Mitchell Hepburn, who was 38 when he became premier in 1934.

Geographically, the premier has been an MPP from Toronto, the Greater Toronto Area, or Ottawa since 2003. Generally however, premiers have come from communities throughout Ontario, including Eastern Ontario, the Lake Huron and Lake Erie coasts, the Greater Toronto Hamilton Area, and from communities further north, such as North Bay and Sault Ste. Marie.

== Role and relationship with the legislature ==
=== Origin of the role ===
The role of premier is not defined by statute, except by reference to higher entitlement to pay under the Executive Council Act. Similarly to the federal system, the existence of a first minister is instead considered a constitutional convention. The role is a pivotal one under the Canadian system of responsible government, where government is expected to be led by someone who has the confidence of the legislature.

=== Relationship with the legislature ===
The premier and government are accountable to the legislature. The premier and executive council can exercise authority given to it by the laws created by the legislature. The flow of authority from the legislature to the executive creates the expectation that the government's actions must obey the law. (Note: Here, government refers to the executive branch, being the members of the Executive Council, not the legislature) The premier is expected to answer for their actions or inactions to the legislature through the responsible government concept of fused branches of government, including through question period. As a member of cabinet, the premier is subject to the constitutional norm of individual ministerial responsibility, and is therefore expected to either be a Member of Provincial Parliament, or to quickly seek election to a seat in the legislature so that they may answer questions from the legislature in debate and question period.

=== Determination of premier ===
The premier is appointed by the lieutenant governor, who represents the head of state. The premier then presides over the Executive Council, or cabinet. The Executive Council Act stipulates that the leader of the government party is known as the "Premier and President of the Council". Due to Ontario being a unicameral Westminster-style parliamentary government, the premier is typically the leader of the party which has the most support in the Legislative Assembly at that time.

Members are first elected to the legislature during general elections. General elections must be conducted every four years from the date of the last election. An election may also happen if the governing party loses the confidence of the legislature, by the defeat of a supply bill or tabling of a confidence motion. Premiers hold office by virtue of their ability to command the confidence of the elected Legislative Assembly. They typically sit as a member of Provincial Parliament (MPP) and lead the largest party or a coalition in the assembly. Once sworn in, the premier holds office until their resignation or is removed by the lieutenant governor after either a motion of no confidence or defeat in a general election. The premier does not have to be serving in Provincial Parliament to be selected as premier. In practice, this is highly unlikely to occur in a majority-government situation, while it can occur in a minority-government situation if the government had been struck down by its previous partners.

=== Duration of the role ===
The government exists independently of the legislature. While the legislature may be dissolved for an election, the executive council continues serving under the caretaker convention, where government ceases to make major policy decisions except in response to disaster. The premier has been a continuous role since 1914, when there was a one-week vacancy in the office between James Whitney and William Howard Hearst. In modern times, the premier serves until their successor is sworn in. There are no term limits on the role of premier, the premier may continue serving as long as they retain the confidence of the legislature.

=== Deputy Premier ===
Deputy premiers may be selected by the premier and often concurrently hold other senior roles within the cabinet. However, the role of deputy premier holds no specific formal power, and does not automatically receive any powers in the case of absence or death of a premier.

== Functions ==
=== Selection of the cabinet ===
The premier plays multiple functions in the Ontario political system, mirroring most conventions of the federal level of Canadian government. The premier has a near absolute power to determine the structure of the cabinet, to choose ministers, and to dismiss them at will, the Executive Council Act does not carry any restrictions on who can serve as a minister. The premier is constrained by certain democratic norms and constitutional conventions. For example, it expected due to individual ministerial responsibility that each minister shall be an MPP, or shall swiftly seek a seat in the legislature by participating in a by-election. It is expected that ministers are residents of the province. It is also expected that there be some level of diversity within the cabinet, on a geographic basis as much as the number of MPPs in the governing party permits. A premier will generally select ministers based on many factors including diversity, rewarding past or expected loyalty, satisfying factions within their party, creating a narrative or symbolism about choices, and primarily by who they expect can competently make decisions in a politically successful manner.

The premier also has large amounts of discretion over the creation, composition and dissolution of cabinet committees, except the Treasury Board, which has its existence and size established by statute.

=== Political decision making ===
A premier is at the centre of political decision making in Ontario. Cabinet collective responsibility (otherwise known as cabinet solidarity) is a concept that outlines that if a minister has serious issues with the direction of a government or premier, they must either accept the decision without public criticism of the premier or resign. This custom gives cabinet ministers little ability to exercise power or make decisions contrary to the will of the premier if the premier has made their position known within cabinet. While smaller decisions may often be made by individual ministers, a 1999 paper suggests anything representing policy reversal, large new policy, inter-departmental effects, politically sensitive or involving substantial financial expenditure will be brought to cabinet. The premier exercises power of political decision making through use of the Cabinet Office and the Office of the Premier. The Cabinet Office provides policy analysis and oversight over the Ontario Public Service, and the office Office of the Premier is responsible for political analysis, coordination with ministers' offices, and communications strategy. Large political decisions are usually made with proposals and discussions at a cabinet committee or cabinet level, where frank discussions on inter-departmental effects or political considerations can take in a structured way in a highly confidential environment at the centre of government. This typically follows heavy preparatory work on the part of minister's offices and staff, as well as civil service policy analysts. This is the ultimate representation of the challenge function, where political leaders are meant to provide direction, input, and political scrutiny on professional civil service advice. Decisions made at the cabinet table may include to proceed with legislative changes, establishing a change in regulation, responding to a crisis, and allocation of scarce resources such as money, time or political capital.

The premier also plays an important part in determination of regulation. Regulations are passed via order-in-council, which are how the government exercises many powers delegated to them under laws passed by the legislature. Orders-in-council are public once signed by the lieutenant governor, but are only signed by the lieutenant governor on the advice of the premier, which has traditionally meant being passed at cabinet. In the cases of appointments, the premier and their office can have heavy involvement in the selection of a certain subset of appointments, though reforms have led to an increased level of formality through the Public Appointment Secretariat, which in some cases provides recommendations for appointments to the premier or the minister for ministerial-level appointments.

=== Communications ===
The premier is ultimately the face of their party in the province, and continues to play a role in partisan politics. The premier is also bound by individual ministerial responsibility, and is expected to present themselves to question period on an at least occasional basis. They may try to shape media framing of government priorities, do damage control on government controversies, or draw contrasts with leaders of opposition parties. The communications role has more recently expanded to encompass social media, with Premier Doug Ford launching a communications strategy of news-style direct-to-voter communications via social media. The premier sets the tone for communications through all of government, with a leader typically attempting to cultivate a "brand", to varying levels of success.

=== Legislative strategy ===
The premier also makes decisions on the legislative agenda in coordination with their cabinet, deciding how to use limited time in the legislative assembly to pass desired legislation, which can have long-lasting effects even after their government is out of power. This will happen in coordination with the government house leader, who conducts inter-party negotiations if needed and manages scheduling and the government whip, who ensures compliance and attendance by members of the government's party when votes come up. This process is especially tenuous in a minority parliament (also known as a minority government), in which the government is not unilaterally able to pass legislation in the same way they can unilaterally pass orders-in-Council, and requires other parties to support the government's legislative agenda. The premier also has a major role to play in declaring certain votes in provincial parliament as "votes of confidence", votes that will lead to the premier asking the lieutenant governor for an election if the vote fails, forcing opposition leaders to consider whether they are ready for an election. Budgets, and other funding bills are always confidence votes as are the address in reply to speech from the throne that happen at the beginning of each parliamentary session. On supply days, where the opposition controls the schedule, the opposition can introduce a confidence motion. However, importantly, the premier can cause any vote to be a confidence vote by declaring it so.

=== Constitutional advice ===
A final function of the premier is to give advice to the lieutenant governor. While advice often refers to regulation, appointments and spending, which the lieutenant governor would never refuse, there are cases in which the lieutenant governor retains reserve powers and has some discretion in matters. The premier can advise that the lieutenant governor prorogue provincial parliament, which can be a controversial way to avoid a confidence vote or parliamentary investigation in a minority parliament, and try to reset their image after a lower profile break. In extraordinary circumstances, the lieutenant governor may refuse this advice, but in general, there is great latitude given to prime ministers in requesting prorogation. The premier can advise the lieutenant governor to call an early election, an election before the required date, a move that can help a popular governing party win an election while their popularity is high, or attempt to win a majority parliament when they currently only hold a minority. This decision can be controversial in a minority government, and if a short time has passed since a recent election, and the lieutenant governor believes another leader can command confidence in parliament, they may refuse the advice of the premier, dismiss the premier, and invite the other leader to become the next premier. A gracious premier who has lost an election can also provide advice to the lieutenant governor that another leader be selected as the next premier, advising that they, the current premier, cannot command confidence in the commons, instead of waiting to fail a confidence vote.

=== Role in federalism ===
The premier plays some role in Canadian federalism, with the power to comment about federal politics or respond to federal politics, as then-Premier Kathleen Wynne did in proposing an Ontario Retirement Pension Plan, which pushed the federal government into an expansion of the Canada Pension Plan. These actions can also be ineffective. Premier Doug Ford refused to participate in the carbon price regime of Prime Minister Justin Trudeau, but refusal to participate did not lead to any changes in the program.

In cases of changing the Canadian constitution, the premier's influence over the provincial legislature's priorities and schedule would play a large role in passing any constitutional amendment. Canada's constitution has an amending formula where most changes require seven provinces representing 50 per cent of Canada's population, and most other amendments require approval by all provinces. As a result of its high population, Ontario has an effective veto on any constitutional change unless Quebec supports it, which is highly unlikely due to Quebec's historical refusal to legitimize a constitutional system which does not give them a full veto over constitutional change.

As first minister, the premier also acts as Ontario's representative to the First Ministers' conferences and Council of the Federation, meeting with other Canadian first ministers to discuss issues where inter-provincial co-operation may be required or beneficial.

The premier through cabinet or through consultation with the attorney general is finally likely to approve any intergovernmental lawsuits of the Government of Ontario against the federal government. For example, the Ontario government recently was involved in a court case regarding the constitutionality of the carbon pricing regime.

The role of federalism has also evolved, with areas of provincial responsibility now having federal dollars backing them, leading to a more integrated role on whether premiers will accept the conditions attached to those dollars. Such an issue was pertinent in 2021, where Ontario is the sole province not to sign on to a vastly expanded federal financial commitment under its childcare accords.

=== Minister ===
The premier, as well as other ministers, can hold multiple portfolios. The premier typically also holds the portfolio for intergovernmental affairs, though exceptions may exist, with Dalton McGuinty having three ministers who served at different times when he himself was not, and premiers Mike Harris and Ernie Eves, who never elected to hold the roles during their tenure. Even while another person may hold that ministerial title, the premier is still likely to serve a major intergovernmental affairs role through their presence at first ministers conferences. This role typically has a mostly domestic role, but can also play an international one.

Premiers may also choose to hold another ministry title, whether for symbolic reasons or for treating the ministry as a serious priority. While Leslie Frost served for a short time as the minister for the Department of Economics (functionally Minister of Finance), a premier is unlikely to take on a more senior challenging portfolio such as finance, health or education due to their complexity and time demands. Smaller or less complex ministries are more likely to be seen, such as could be seen on the federal level with Canadian prime minister Justin Trudeau taking on the federal cabinet position of Minister of Youth. In Ontario, examples of taking more junior files include Kathleen Wynne serving concurrently as Premier and Minister of Agriculture and Food for one year. Dalton McGuinty took on the role of Minister of Research and Innovation for two years, and as Minister of Economic Development for a short time during the great recession of 2008. These instances are still an exception and not the rule. Since Frost's short time in his ministry, no other premier has taken on a ministerial role except for that of intergovernmental affairs. Prior to Frost, relatively few ministers took on cabinet roles, with the informality of the cabinet structure likely permitting more informal involvement in areas of interest. A notable exception seems to be premier George Stewart Henry, who took on the contemporarily important role of Minister of Highways, and also served a short time as Minister of Finance.

== Cabinet Office ==
The Cabinet Office is the ministry that directly supports the premier, serving the same function provincially as the Privy Council Office does federally. The Cabinet Office plays a coordination role, attempting to harmonize procedures between ministries where possible, as well as monitoring key performance indicators and departmental plans.

The Cabinet Office also includes administrative support for a number of committees:

- Priorities and Planning Committee
- Cabinet Committee on Emergency Management
- Treasury Board / Management Board of Cabinet
- Legislation and Regulations Committee
- Health, Education and Social Policy Committee
- Jobs and Economic Policy Committee

== Premier's Office ==
The Office of the Premier is the partisan centre of government, providing political analysis, communications strategy, issues management, media monitoring and other functions for the benefit of the Premier. The office is headed by the Chief of Staff to the Premier, and will typically also have senior advisors, stakeholder relations specialists, issues management staff, policy advisors, logistical and operations staff for travel, media specialists, legislative affairs staff, and public appointments staff. The size of the office is typically something the premier has wide latitude to determine and place in the provincial budget, as staff are not part of the public service, and are instead hired as partisans, and do work that is partisan in nature. Total spending in the portfolio is approximately $3 million per year and typically encompasses about 75 staff. The office is also the cost centre for a parliamentary assistant to the premier, if the premier chooses to have one. The hiring and firing decisions within this office are generally at the discretion of the Premier, unlike the civil service.

== Pay and benefits ==
The salary of the premier is determined by their pay as an MPP, if they hold a seat in the legislature, which is governed by the Legislative Assembly Act. In addition, the Executive Council Act establishes a premium of 79.3% above the MPP salary, 37% for their role as Premier and the remaining 42.3% if they retain the portfolio of Intergovernmental Affairs. This leads to a total of approximately $209,000. Under the Legislative Assembly Act, the premier would also be permitted to draw benefits with regard to car travel in Toronto, travel to and from home, and compensation for an apartment in Toronto if they do not already reside within 50 kilometers of the city. The premier, like other MPPs, is not entitled to any pension based on their service.

The premier, as a member of the Executive Council, is entitled to use the title "The Honourable" while in office, but is not sworn into the King's Privy Council for Canada, and therefore unlike federal cabinet ministers, provincial premiers are not entitled to use that honorific after they cease to serve on the Executive Council.

== Life after office ==
Most premiers cease to be premier while still in their working life. As a result, premiers have many options for what to do after. In some circumstances, they may stay on as an MPP if they won their seat but no longer had the confidence of the legislative assembly. Kathleen Wynne served one full parliamentary term after her premiership. Many others turn to consulting work, work on corporate or NGO boards, or in academia. Another option is to pursue politics in another instance. Bob Rae went on to serve as a federal Liberal MP, and interim leader of the Liberal Party of Canada. Doug Ford, while a current premier, is a former Toronto mayoral candidate, and some, including a CBC journalist have speculated it may be a position of interest if provincial politics are unfavourable to him, speculating to an extent they thought was worthy asking in an interview.

== See also ==
- List of premiers of Ontario
- Politics of Ontario
- Premier (Canada)
- Deputy Premier of Ontario
- Leader of the Opposition (Ontario)
