= Cabinet Office (Ontario) =

Ministry of the Government of Ontario

- Government of Ontario wordmark

Ministry overview
- Jurisdiction: Government of Ontario
- Headquarters: Whitney Block, 99 Wellesley St. West, Toronto, Ontario
- Minister responsible: Doug Ford, Premier of Ontario
- Ministry executive: Michele DiEmanuele, Secretary of the Cabinet

The Cabinet Office is a ministry of the Government of Ontario. Its role is to serve as the Premier's ministry, and as such, its employees are not political appointees, but are permanent members of the Ontario public service.

The Cabinet Office is headed by the Secretary of the Cabinet, currently Michelle DiEmanuele, who is also head of the Ontario public service.

In past years, the size of the Cabinet Office has grown considerably. This mirrors growth in the central agencies of other governments in the Western world, including the Canadian federal government.
