= Analytics.usa.gov =

Monitor for website traffic in the US federal government

- Owner: General Services Administration
- Creator: 18F
- Website: Analytics.usa.gov
- Registration: None
- Launched: March 15, 2015; 11 years ago

Analytics.usa.gov is a website of the government of the United States, created through a collaboration between GSA's Digital Analytics Program and 18F, based on unified Google Analytics data for some .gov domains.

== History ==
=== Website development ===
Analytics.usa.gov was launched on March 19, 2015 with data for about 300 (out of 1350) .gov domains, including every cabinet department.

On February 18, 2016, analytics.usa.gov introduced agency-specific dashboards for its participating agencies: users could now filter to results only from that specific agency.

=== Forks ===
Around April 22, 2015, the government of Philadelphia launched its own analytics website at analytics.phila.gov, built using a forked version of the source code developed for analytics.usa.gov.

On January 6, 2016, a blog post on analytics.usa.gov discussed adaptations of analytics.usa.gov by three regional governments and government agencies in the United States, including comments by people who had worked on each of the adaptations. The adaptations were for: the city of Philadelphia (noted above), the Tennessee Department of Environment and Conservation, and the city of Boulder, Colorado.

As of July 7, 2017, the following adaptations are listed on the main README of the analytics.usa.gov GitHub repository:

==== City governments ====
Entity	Type of entity	U.S. state (if applicable)	Population in thousands (latest estimate from Wikipedia page as of July 7, 2017)	Launch date (if available)
Anchorage	City	Alaska	298	
Apex	City	North Carolina	47	
Boulder	City	Colorado	108	
Cabarrus County	County	North Carolina	202	
Chesapeake	City	Virginia	233	
Concord	City	North Carolina	90	
Cook County	County	Illinois	5,238	
Douglas County	County	Nebraska	550	
Eagle Mountain	City	Utah	23	
Evanston	City	Illinois	75	
Jersey (States of Jersey)	Country	N/A		
Jersey City	City	New Jersey	264	
Los Angeles	City	California	3976	
Moulton Niguel Water District (Laguna Niguel)	District	California		
Newark	City	New Jersey	282	
New Orleans	City	Louisiana	391	
New York State Energy Research and Development Authority (NYSERDA)	Agency within state government	New York	19,745	
Norristown	Borough	Pennsylvania	34	
Omaha	City	Nebraska	447	
Philadelphia	City	Pennsylvania	1,568	April 22, 2015
Pleasanton	City	California	82	
Princeton	City	New Jersey	31	
Rowan County	County	North Carolina	139	
Sacramento	City	California	495	
San Francisco	City	California	870	
San Leandro	City	California	90	
Santa Monica	City	California	92	
Seattle	City	Washington	704	
Tennessee Department of Environment and Conservation	Agency within federal government	Tennessee	6,651	
United States Department of Education	Agency within federal government	325,146		
United States Department of Veterans Affairs	Agency within federal government	325,146		
Washington State University	University	30		

== Technology ==
The 18F blog provided a detailed description of the technology stack used to build the website, which was picked up by Hacker News and formed the basis of a more picture-heavy version in Storify. The data is collected through a unified Google Analytics account that stores anonymized IP addresses to preserve privacy. This is periodically queried using an open source analytics tool built by 18F called the analytics reporter, whose repository is available on GitHub. The JSON result is stored to Amazon S3 and served statically through Amazon CloudFront. The entire website's code is also available in a GitHub repository.

== Reception ==
=== Privacy concerns ===
A number of people expressed concerns about the storage of potentially private user data in Google Analytics, despite the IP address anonymization. The creators of analytics.usa.gov emphasized that they were concerned with privacy and therefore only revealed aggregated data to the public, rather than allowing arbitrary queries on the data.

=== Analysis of data and suggestions for improvement ===
Discussion of the analytics focused on the fact that pages from the Internal Revenue Service were among the most visited, and the "Where's My Refund?" page had the top spot. This was explained by the timing: taxes were due April 15 and many people had started the process of tax filing. Other top visited pages were on the websites of the National Weather Service, National Park Service, United States Citizenship and Immigration Services, and StopBullying.gov. Greg Boone wrote that analytics.usa.gov is an active expression of government "for the people, of the people, and by the people." He elaborated: "All told, there were nearly 1.4 billion (with a b) people who interacted with the government in the last 90 days. [...] They're coming to the government for information and help they know only the US government can provide. They're coming for public services and resources they can use to improve people lives."

Writing for GovFresh, Luke Fretwell praised analytics.usa.gov and suggested it would be helpful if each agency's website had an analytics subpage that provided information on analytics just for that agency. He also suggested that government agencies avoid spending resources on apps and instead aim to make their main websites more mobile-friendly, and that they reduce their sites' focus on information about the agency and make the services offered more front-and-center. He also recommended that data on spending on websites be made available in conjunction with data on website traffic so that the return on investment to spending would be clearer.
