= Sarah Allen (software developer) =

American software developer

- Born: Sarah Lindsley
- Occupations: Entrepreneur and software developer

Sarah Allen (born Sarah Lindsley) is an American software developer and entrepreneur. Allen attended Brown University in Rhode Island, where she majored in computer science and visual arts. Early in her career, she led the development of Adobe Shockwave Multiuser Server, Flash Media Server, and Flash Video, and co-founded the company that created Adobe After Effects. In 2013, Allen was selected for the Presidential Innovation Fellows program working with the Smithsonian Institution.

== Companies ==
In 2010, Allen co-founded and serves as the chief technology officer of mobile startup Mightyverse. In parallel she is the founder of San Francisco-based Ruby on Rails consultancy Blazing Cloud, a product-centric mobile application consulting firm. In 2010, she co-authored the book Pro Smartphone Cross-Platform Development.

== Representation of women ==
In the Silicon Valley community, Allen contributes her time to improving the representation of women in technology as the president of RailsBridge, which aims to "bridge the gap from aspiring developer to contributing open source community member through mentoring, teaching and writing".

== Recognition ==
In 1998, Allen was named one of the Top 25 Women of the Web by San Francisco Women on the Web. Allen was honored on Ada Lovelace Day by the Bay Area Girl Geek Dinners in 2010 and participated in the mobile-themed Google Tech Talk at the company's headquarters in Mountain View. In 2013, Allen was chosen as a Presidential Innovation Fellow and worked for six months with the Smithsonian Institution.

== Publications ==
- "The Future of the Web is not the Past of Windows" W3C Position Paper: Workshop on Web Applications and Compound Documents. June 2004.
- "Pro Smartphone Cross-Platform Development iPhone, Blackberry, Windows Mobile and Android Development and Distribution" Sept 2010, Apress.
