= Technology Modernization Fund =

Technology funds provided by the United States Government

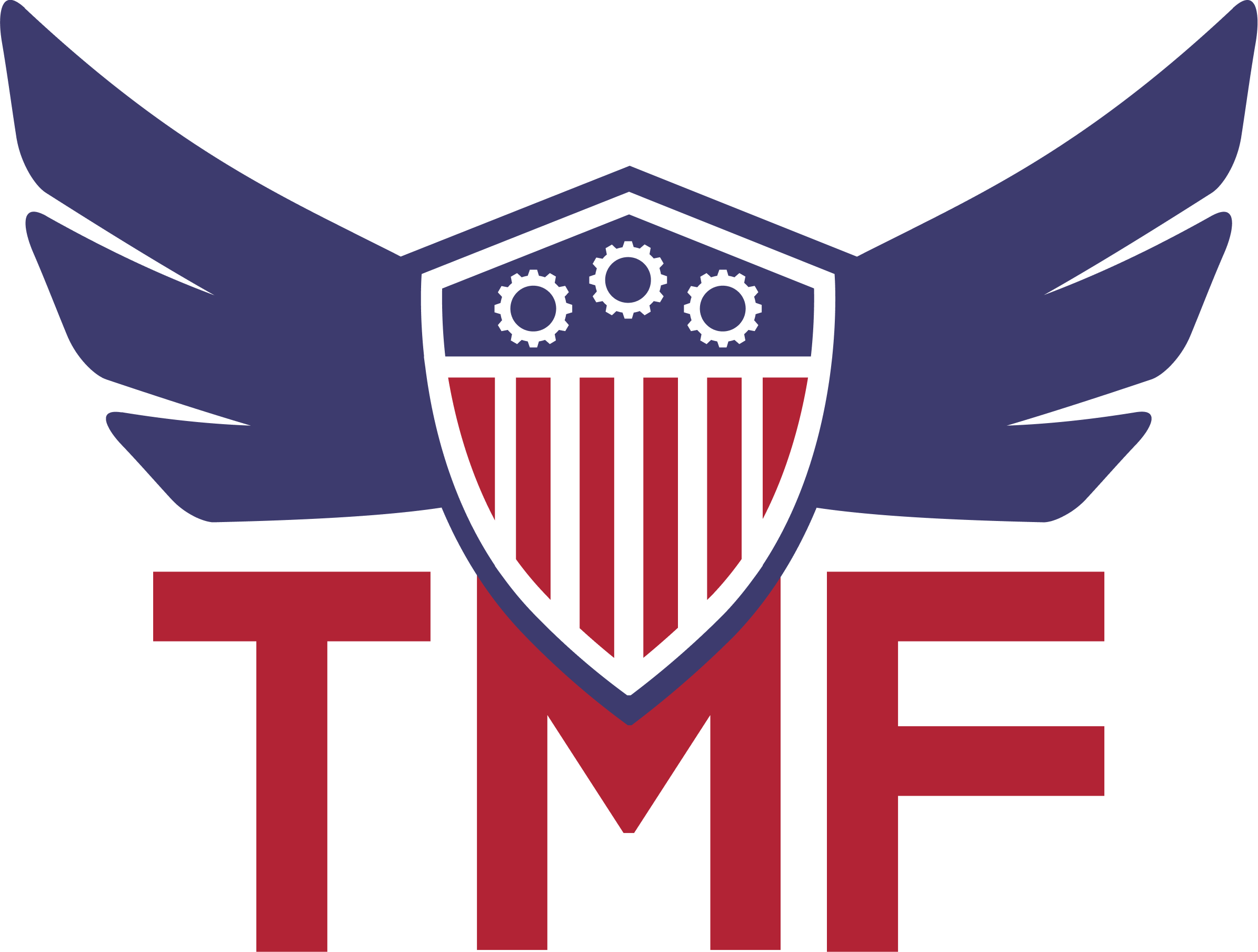
- Founded: 2017
- Area served: U.S. government and customers
- Owner: General Services Administration (GSA) and Office of Management and Budget (OMB)
- Services: Funding
- URL: tmf.cio.gov
- Commercial: No

The Technology Modernization Fund (TMF) is a technology and innovation funding vehicle, authorized by the Modernizing Government Technology Act of 2017. TMF provides multi-year funding to agencies to deliver services to the American public more quickly, securely, and responsively. TMF is managed as a partnership between the TMF Board, the General Services Administration (GSA), and the Office of Management and Budget (OMB). TMF operates on a repayable model requiring agencies to reimburse the fund.

== Background ==
In 2017, federal IT modernization was deemed urgent due to a number of high-profile failures such as Healthcare.gov, aging infrastructure, and security concerns flagged by the Government Accountability Office (GAO). GAO found that agencies were spending a majority of their IT budget maintaining legacy systems.

The bipartisan Modernization Government Technology (MGT) Act was signed into law in December, 2017 and was informed by a number of existing bills including Rep. Will Hurd’s Modernizing Outdated and Vulnerable Equipment and Information Technology, MOVE IT, Act and Rep. Steny Hoyer’s IT Modernization Act. The MGT Act included two primary provisions including the establishment of the Technology Modernization Fund (TMF) and the Technology Modernization Board.

== Goals ==
The funding needed to support large IT modernization efforts are often hard for federal agencies to justify. The purpose of TMF is to give agencies more flexibility by providing them with multi-year funding to invest in modern technology solutions and deliver services to the American public more quickly, securely, and responsively. The MGT Act states the fund should "improve, retire, or replace existing federal IT systems to enhance cybersecurity and improve efficiency and effectiveness." TMF also emphasizes proposals that support system updates, modular architecture, automated processes, improved operations, fraud prevention, deduplication, and utilization of existing shared services.

== Funding and Administration ==
TMF is managed as a partnership between the TMF Board, the Office of Management and Budget (OMB), and the General Services Administration (GSA) who administers the funds. The initial MGT Act and subsequent guidance established a board with seven members, including the Federal Chief Information Officer (CIO), senior officials from GSA and Department of Homeland Security, and four federal employees with technical expertise in information technology development, financial management, cybersecurity and privacy, and acquisition, appointed by the Director of OMB.

The amount in the fund fluctuates year over year. The MGT Act included an initial $250 million in appropriations for both the 2018 and 2019 fiscal years. In 2022, the fund included an additional $1 billion from the American Rescue Plan Act although some of those funds were later reappropriated. For fiscal year 2026, GSA proposed supplying the fund with alternate sources to reduce the reliance on congressional funding, including collecting deobligated funds from agencies.

To-date, the TMF has operated on a repayable model requiring agencies to reimburse some or all of the funds. To access the funds, agencies must first submit a proposal, detailing the effort, milestones, and other details. As of 2024, 40 of the 60 TMF funded projects have reimbursed the fund.

== Impact ==
As of 2024, TMF has made 63 investments across 34 federal agencies, totaling $1 billion. According to OMB staff, the projects TMF invests in has a 80% success rate compared to the 13% success rate of large government projects that use traditional budgeting methods, partially due to the hands-on technical assistance and guidance from TMF.

Notable investments include:

- NASA: Accelerate cybersecurity and operational upgrades to its network.
- U.S. Department of Labor (DOL): Replace outdated worker compensation system.
- U.S. Department of Justice (DOJ) Antitrust Division: Improve customer communication support.
- Veterans Affairs (VA): Digitize paper forms and services for Veterans.

== Criticism ==
Experts and government officials have expressed the need to find new funding mechanisms that don't rely upon congressional appropriations. For fiscal year 2026, GSA proposed supplying the fund with alternate sources to reduce the reliance on congressional funding, including collecting deobligated funds from agencies.

Other suggested improvements call for the fund to shift from funding static IT modernization to building internal agency capabilities—through training, investment criteria based on product methods, and funding dedicated product teams—to drive continuous, user-focused transformation.

== See also ==
- General Services Administration
- Office of Management and Budget
- Technology Transformation Services
- 18F
- U.S. Digital Service
