= Federal Chief Information Officer of the United States =

U.S. government position

Chief Information Officer of the United States

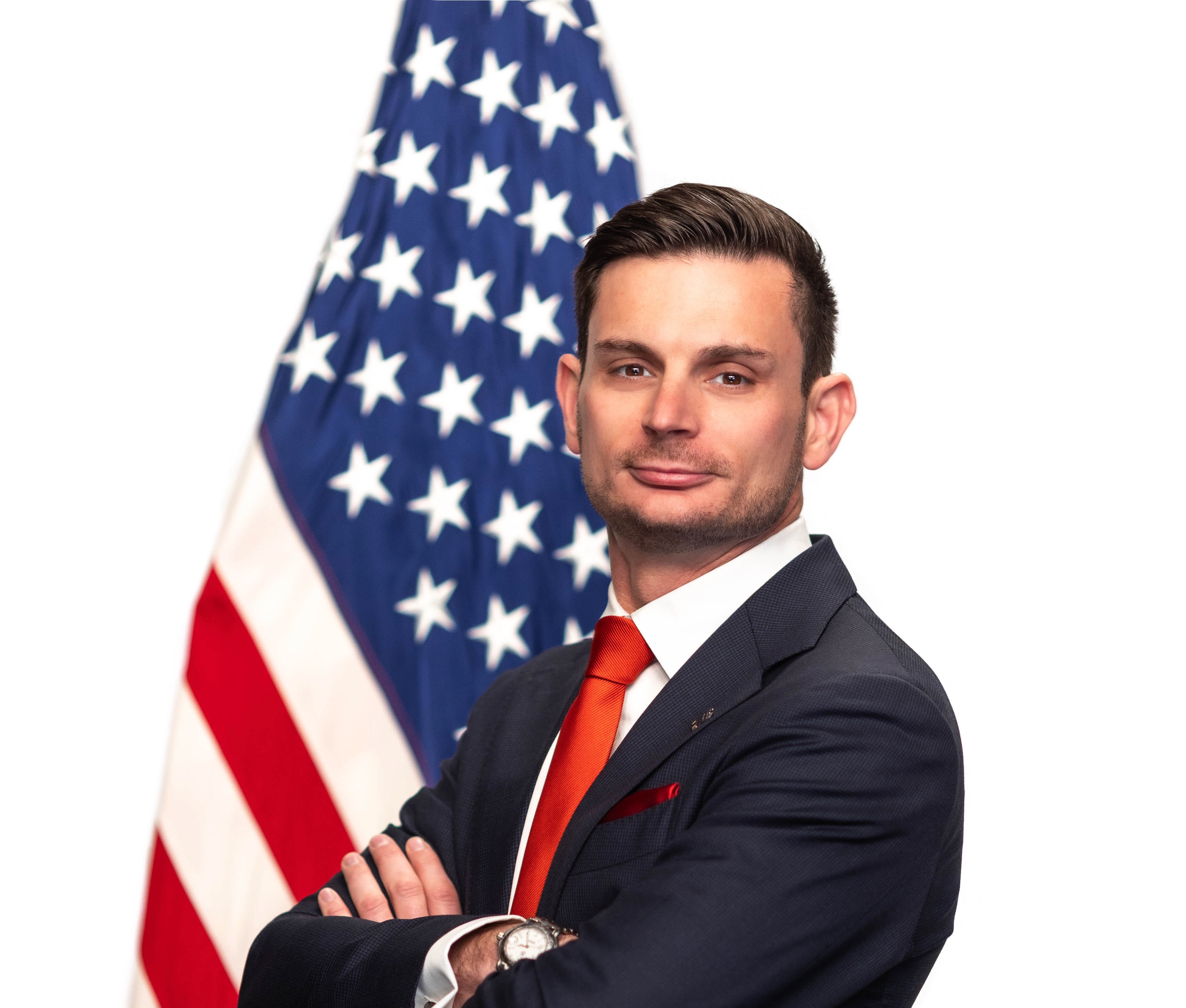
- Incumbent; Greg Barbaccia since January 23, 2025
- First holder: Mark Forman

The federal chief information officer of the United States, also known as the United States chief information officer, is the administrator of the Office of Electronic Government, or the Office of the Federal CIO (OFCIO), which is part of the Office of Management and Budget. The president appoints the Federal CIO. The appointee does not require Senate confirmation. It was created by the E-Government Act of 2002.

The US CIO oversees federal technology spending, federal IT policy, and strategic planning of all federal IT investments. The CIO is charged with establishing a government-wide enterprise architecture that ensures system interoperability, information sharing, and maintains effective information security and privacy controls across the federal government. The US CIO also disseminates information regarding the Federal Risk Management Program FedRAMP, for cloud services to Federal CIOs and other representatives through cross-agency communications and events.

== Officeholders ==
Name	Term	Political Party	Title
Mark Forman	2003	Republican	Office of E-Government and Information Technology
Karen Evans	2003-2009	Republican	E-Gov Act Administrator
Vivek Kundra	2009-2011	Democrat	U.S. Federal Chief Information Officer
Steven VanRoekel	2011-2014	Democrat	U.S. Chief Information Officer
Lisa Schlosser	2014-2015	Democrat	Acting Federal Chief Information Officer
Tony Scott	2015-2017	Democrat	U.S. Chief Information Officer
Margie Graves	2017-2018	Democrat	Acting U.S. Chief Information Officer
Suzette Kent,	2018-2020	Republican	U.S. Chief Information Officer
Basil Parker	2020-2021	Republican	U.S. Chief Information Officer
Clare Martorana	2021-2025	Democrat	U.S. Chief Information Officer
Greg Barbaccia	2025-2026	Republican	U.S. Chief Information Officer

== See also ==
- Chief Technology Officer of the United States
