= Tested Ability to Leverage Exceptional National Talent Act of 2017 =

- Long title: An act to amend title 5, United States Code, to codify the Presidential Innovation Fellows program, and for other purposes.
- Acronyms (colloquial): TALENT Act of 2017
- Enacted by: the 115th United States Congress
- Effective: 01/20/2017

Citations
- Public law: Pub. L. 115–1 (text) (PDF)

Codification
- U.S.C. sections created: 5 U.S.C. § 3171; 5 U.S.C. § 3172

Legislative history
- Introduced in the House as H.R.39 by Rep. Kevin McCarthy (R-CA) on 01/03/2017; Committee consideration by House Committee on Oversight and Government Reform; Passed the House on 01/11/2017 (Passed/agreed to in House by 386-17 (2/3 Required); Passed the Senate on 01/17/2017 (Without amendment by Unanimous Consent); Signed into law by President Barack Obama on 1/20/2017

The Tested Ability to Leverage Exceptional National Talent Act of 2017 or TALENT Act (Pub. L. 115–1 (text) (PDF),H.R. 39) was the last act to be signed into law by President Barack Obama during the last hour of his presidency and the first act to be enacted into law by the 115th Congress. It was introduced in the United States House of Representatives on January 3, 2017 by Representative Kevin McCarthy of California. The bill, which was signed by Obama on January 20, 2017, codified the Presidential Innovation Fellows program.

The bill was considered by the House Committee on Oversight and Government Reform before being passed by the House on January 11, 2017 by a vote of 386-17. It passed in the Senate on January 17, 2017.
