= Geoff Mulligan =

American computer scientist

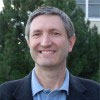

Geoff Mulligan is an American computer scientist who developed embedded internet technology and 6LoWPAN. He was chairman of the LoRa Alliance from its creation in 2015 until 2018, was previously founder and chairman of the IPSO Alliance, is a consultant on the Internet of Things, and in 2013, was appointed a Presidential Innovation Fellow.

== Life ==
Raised in Palo Alto, California, Mulligan attended Henry M. Gunn High School. He graduated from the United States Air Force Academy in 1979 with a bachelor's degree in computer science and a Master Of Science (M.S.) from the University of Denver.

== Career ==
While in the Air Force, he worked on the ARPAnet. The ARPAnet evolved into the Defense Data Network, where he worked on security and performance and also designed and directed installation of the Pentagon data networks that used cable TV technology.

Mulligan returned to the Air Force Academy, where he oversaw the design and installation of the Academy's local area network, FALCONnet.

In 1990, Mulligan joined Digital Equipment Corporation in Palo Alto. He focused on network security, electronic mail, TCP/IP networking, networking tools and firewall technology. He worked on the DEC SEAL firewall, and on the IPv6 protocol working group.

Mulligan began working at Sun Microsystems in 1992. He developed and maintained the Solaris TCP/IP utilities and kernel. He also worked on Sun's wide area network and firewall complex. He continued with the IPv6 design team and wrote a PC-based implementation, called N6AFV, along with a packet decoder, and worked on the development of an IPv4/IPv6 border gateway. He was the principal architect of Sun's firewall product, Sunscreen SPF 100.

Mulligan further developed Sunscreen, adding network address translation, an internal Java interpreter and topology hiding technologies. In 1997, he created HZ.COM, an electronic mail information retrieval system for two-way pagers and early cellular phones. When the HZ.COM domain was hijacked in 2002, the incident was featured in the International Corporation for Assigned Names and Numbers (ICANN) Security and Stability Advisory Committee's report of 2005. He took a sabbatical from Sun to start USA.net, one of the first e-mail outsourcing providers. He left Sun to co-found Geocast Network Systems, where he was responsible for operating system design and support, as well as network architecture for the evolving Internet multicast communication technology that the company was developing. Following Geocast, Mulligan co-founded Interosa as chief technology officer and, subsequently, chief executive. Interosa was building a new policy-based privacy technology for digital content and an email privacy system that was based on their new technology. The company was shut down in November 2000.

In 2001, Mulligan was hired by Invensys as the chief scientist for the Home Controls Division, where he worked on resource and energy management technology, including home gateway design and development, web-based tools, and low-power, low-speed, low-cost wireless networks such as the IEEE 802.15 standards marketed with the Zigbee trademark. Invensys worked on a project to put wireless IPv6 communications in smoke alarms and appliances.

He was one of the founding board members of the Zigbee Alliance and was co-chair of the 6LoWPAN Working Group in the Internet Engineering Task Force (IETF). He was instrumental in the design of the IPv6 protocol and created and named 6LoWPAN. In 2006, he started the firm Proto6, consulting for companies and the US Department of Defense. Mulligan worked with others to launch the Internet Protocol for Smart Objects (IPSO) Alliance in 2008.

In June 2013, Mulligan became one of the second round of Presidential Innovation Fellows, working at the National Institute of Standards and Technology (NIST) and was co-creator of the White House's SmartAmerica Challenge. He is currently serving as the U.S. representative to the ISO Strategic Advisory Group on Smart and Sustainable Cities and is also currently serving as the Chairman of the LoRa Alliance and on the Board of Directors for the IPSO Alliance.

== Works ==
Mulligan holds over 15 patents in computer security, networking and electronic mail. In 1999 he wrote Removing the Spam: Email Processing and Filtering. The book explains the operation and management of two widely distributed Unix e-mail tools: Sendmail and Procmail.

== Congressional testimony ==
In 1997, Mulligan testified before Congress on electronic commerce and computer security. The Committee on Science held a briefing on Secure Communications in February, the second in a series of briefings on computer security. The theme of the briefing was the need to protect the confidential nature of private communications and to ensure that stored proprietary data remains uncompromised. He spoke on "Security Through Containment", and explained how networks are designed and built to facilitate the sharing and distribution of data and information, while the goal of security is to limit and control the distribution of information. One method for providing both connectivity and security is through the use of containment.
