= Beverly Park Woolf =

American computer scientist

- Education: Smith College, University of Massachusetts Amherst
- Occupations: Computer scientist, professor emerita
- Employer: University of Massachusetts Amherst
- Known for: Applications of artificial intelligence in educational technology and intelligent tutoring systems
- Notable work: Building Intelligent Interactive Tutors: Student-Centered Strategies for Revolutionizing E-Learning (2008)
- Awards: Fellow of the Association for the Advancement of Artificial Intelligence (1996), Presidential Innovation Fellow (2013)

Beverly Park Woolf is a retired American computer scientist specializing in the applications of artificial intelligence in educational technology and intelligent tutoring systems. She is a professor emerita in the Manning College of Information & Computer Sciences at the University of Massachusetts Amherst.

== Education and career ==
Woolf majored in physics as an undergraduate at Smith College. She continued her studies as a graduate student at the University of Massachusetts Amherst, earning a master's degree in computer science in 1980, a Ph.D. in computer science in 1984, and an Ed.D. in 1990.

She returned to the University of Massachusetts Amherst as a faculty member in 1992, became a research professor there in 2006, and directed the university's Center for Knowledge Communication. She has retired to become a professor emerita.

== Books ==
Woolf is the author of Building Intelligent Interactive Tutors: Student-Centered Strategies for Revolutionizing E-Learning (Elsevier / Morgan Kaufmann, 2008). She is a coauthor of Transforming Learning with New Technologies (with Robert W. Malloy, Ruth-Ellen A. Verock-O'Loughlin, and Sharon A. Edwards, Pearson, 2010; 4th ed., 2021).

== Recognition ==
Woolf was named a Fellow of the Association for the Advancement of Artificial Intelligence in 1996, "for contributions to the science, technology, and dissemination of multimedia, intelligent tutoring systems and authoring tools". She was named as a Presidential Innovation Fellow in 2013. She was elected to the 2025 class of Fellows of the American Association for the Advancement of Science.
