= American Council for Technology and Industry Advisory Council =

American Council for Technology and Industry Advisory Council (ACT-IAC)
Council overview
- Formed: 1989; 37 years ago
- Preceding Council: Federation of Government Information Processing Councils (FGIPC)
- Type: Partnership
- Website: Official website

The American Council for Technology (ACT) and Industry Advisory Council (IAC) is a non-profit public-private partnership dedicated to improving government through the application of information technology. ACT-IAC provides a collaborative forum where government and industry representatives exchange information and collaborate on technology issues affecting the public sector.

Established in 1979 as the Federation of Government Information Processing Councils (FGIPC). ACT later created the Industry Advisory Council to expand participation by private-sector technology organizations. Together, the organizations operate as ACT-IAC.

ACT-IACT sponsors conferences, working groups, and other programs focused on government information technology, leadership and public-sector innovation. By the 2020s, ACT-IAC conferences and forums were used for discussions on federal technology modernization, cybersecurity, procurement, and artificial intelligence.

== History ==
Established in 1979 as the Federation of Government Information Processing Councils (FGIPC), ACT was created to assist government in using information technology to improve government operations and serve the public. Governed by a board of directors composed of government executives, ACT provides a forum for government employees to collaborate on high-priority IT issues.

In 1989 ACT established the Industry Advisory Council (IAC) to bring the private sector IT industry into this unique collaborative forum.

In 2025, former US Department of Agriculture chief information officer, Gary Washington, jointed ACT-IAC leadership following his departure from federal office.

== Programs and activities ==
ACT-IAC sponsors two major events each year, the Management of Change Conference (MOC) and the Executive Leadership Conference (ELC). Other events include the Small Business Conference (SBC) and the High Performance Computing Conference.

In the 2020s, ACTI-ICT events focused on artificial intelligence adoption, cybersecurity resilience, procurement modernization, and digital transformation in the federal government. Coverage of the 2024 and 2025 Imagine Nation Executive Leadership Conferences highlighted discussions involving federal cloud acquisition, fraud prevention, and AI policy.

The organization's 2024 AI Acquisition Forum featured Defense Department officials discussing federal AI procurement priorities and implementation challenges. ACT-IAC's 2024 Cybersecurity Summit emphasized interagency collaboration on cyber resilience and disaster preparedness. In the same year, ACT-IAC published a strategic plan for 2024-2028, outlining priorities including innovation, workforce development, collaboration, and emerging technologies.

== Membership ==
There is a broad spectrum of industry members including Esri, Booz Allen Hamilton, Deloitte, Ernst & Young, CivicActions, Mitre Corporation, McKinsey & Company, Microsoft, Gartner, and many more.

== Awards ==
ACT-IAC administers recognition programs including the Innovation Champion Awards, which have highlighted federal technology initiatives involving transportation security and emergency response.
