= Steven VanRoekel =

American government official

2nd Chief Information Officer of the United States
- In office August 5, 2011 – October 1, 2014
- President: Barack Obama
- Preceded by: Vivek Kundra
- Succeeded by: Lisa Schlosser

Personal details
- Education: Iowa State University (BA)

Steven VanRoekel was named the Office of Management and Budget's Acting Deputy Director for Management on May 21, 2013. He was also the second Federal Chief Information Officer of the United States and previously worked for the Federal Communications Commission, the United States Agency for International Development, and at Microsoft.

In September 2014, VanRoekel announced that he would leave the Office of Management and Budget and return to USAID to advise the agency on technology matters in its response to the Ebola outbreak.

== Private sector ==
VanRoekel worked for Microsoft in various capacities from 1994 to 2009, including a stint as Speech and Strategy Assistant to Bill Gates, the corporation's co-founder, and as Senior Director of the Windows Server division. While at Microsoft, VanRoekel was named Microsoft's Redmond Manager of the Year and received the "Best in Show" award at the Consumer Electronics Show for innovative marketing and the use of new media.

== Public sector ==
=== Federal Communications Commission (FCC) ===
VanRoekel began his public sector career in 2009 as the Managing Director of the Federal Communications Commission where he oversaw all operational, technical, financial, and human resource aspects of the agency. During his tenure at the FCC, VanRoekel was credited with jump-starting efforts to modernize the agency's aging IT infrastructure. He oversaw the relaunch of the agency's web presence into an open-source based, cloud powered platform, launched a Twitter account that grew to more than 400,000 followers, launched the first federal "developer" website, crowd-sourcing data with help from citizens for projects like the National Broadband Map, and became the first agency to accept public comment via social media tools. He also updated the FCC staff's use of technology by deploying WiFi throughout the building, installing Internet-powered phones, and creating the Technology Experience Center (TEC).

=== United States Agency for International Development (USAID) ===
Before he was named CIO, he was the Executive Director of Citizen and Organizational Engagement at the United States Agency for International Development (USAID).

== Early life and education ==
VanRoekel received a B.A. in Management of Information Systems from Iowa State University where he was the editor of his college yearbook, The Bomb. VanRoekel grew up in Cherokee, Iowa and attended Washington High School.
