= Michelle DiEmanuele =

Canadian civil servant

Michelle DiEmanuele, is a Canadian executive and civil servant who currently serves as Secretary of the Cabinet and Clerk of the Executive Council for the government of Ontario.

== Career ==
She graduated with a bachelor's degree in political science from the University of Waterloo in 1987. In 1994, she graduated from the University of Toronto with a master's degree in political science.

From 2004 to 2008, she served as a deputy minister for the government of Ontario under Premier Dalton McGuinty, where she helped introduce online birth certificate and other digital services to the public, and the first-ever "Money Back Guarantee" for government services in North America. During her tenure she was also recognized as the most influential Top 40 under 40 in the past decade, a recognition she first received in 1998. In April 2007, she was named the interim head of the Ontario Lottery and Gaming Corporation. That year, she was named among the Top 100 most powerful women in Canada by The Globe And Mail.

After leaving her role in the government, she became president of the Credit Valley Hospital in August 2008. She later became president of Trillium Health Partners after Credit Valley merged with the Trillium Health Centre.

In January 2014, Mississauga Mayor Hazel McCallion announced that DiEmanuele had been appointed Chair of the Healthy City Stewardship Centre, a Mississauga-based partnership to improve the health of the community.

In 2016, she was included in a Toronto Police Service task force on modernizing the service.

In late May 2021, she was named Secretary of the Cabinet, replacing the retiring Steven Davidson. Premier Doug Ford cited DiEmanuele would lead the government out of COVID-19 pandemic, and jump start the province's economy to create good jobs and strong communities. In this role, she oversees government operations and leads more than 60,000 staff, from deputy ministers to clerks, responsible for implementing policy and providing services throughout the province.

On January 28, 2025 the Ontario Lieutenant Governor issued a proclamation to dissolve the Legislature, at the request of Premier Ford. Effective immediately, the government and the Ontario Public Service, and DiEmanuele overtook conventions traditionally followed during an election period. This included obligations to provide professional, neutral and non-partisan service.

In July 2025, Premier Ford extended DiEmanuele's term for three years.

== Awards and recognitions ==
DiEmanuele has demonstrated her dedication to public service and contributed significantly to Ontario and Canada. Her efforts have been recognized through various accolades.

She has been recognized as the most influential Top 40 under 40 twice, first in 1998 and again between 2004-2008 for introducing online birth certificate and other digital services to the public.

In 2012, she was awarded a Queen Elizabeth II Diamond Jubilee Medal, which is awarded to individuals who have made significant contributions to Canada .

In 2020, she was appointed to the Order of Ontario, as a member of the advisory council.

In 2023, she was bestowed with an honorary Doctor of Laws (Hon. LL.D.) from the Faculty of Community Services at the Toronto Metropolitan University for her dedication to public service, community building and transformative leadership.

In March 2025, she was awarded Kings Charles III's Coronation Medal for significant public service contributions to Ontario and Canada.

== Media coverage ==
In 2013, under DiEmanuele leadership, the Trillium Health Partners radiology review was launched. This was a medical quality assurance investigation triggered by diagnostic errors made by radiologist Dr. Ivo "Ivan" Slezic at Trillium Health Partners hospitals.

In April 2013, a new quality assurance program identified interpretive errors in Slezic's work, including missed cancer diagnoses on CT scans. The hospital subsequently reviewed 3,500 CT scans and mammograms performed by Slezic between April 2012 and March 2013 at Mississauga Hospital and Queensway Health Centre. The review, conducted by over 20 radiologists led by an external expert, identified at least one case where delayed cancer diagnosis resulted in disease progression from an earlier to advanced stage, affecting patient treatment options.

In December 2021, a group of physicians submitted a letter to the Ontario Ministry of Health raising concerns about hospital administration at Trillium Health Partners. The Ministry appointed an inspector to review the matter. In March 2023, the inspector reported that the allegations could not be substantiated.

In February 2025, DiEmanuele's direction to Premier Ford staff to remove Progressive Conservative (PC) Party branding from a Washington D.C. anti-tariff mission video was heavily covered by the media. She had advised the office against the actions, which included using the video from the trip as campaign material, and designating two PC Party campaign workers on the trip as government staff. The video was reposted without party logos, and DiEmanuele requested the integrity commissioner review the appropriate use of government resources during election.

In August 2025, an internal memo on return to office policy from DiEmanuele to Ontario Public Service staff was shared with Global News. The memo echoed the governments decision ordering public servants to move forward with five days in-office policy, officially ending pandemic remote work policies. The policy was implemented in early January 2026, with tens of thousands of Ontario public servants returning to the workplace full-time.

== Controversies ==
In February 2022, DiEmanuele was named in a lawsuit brought forward by the former finance director of Trillium Health Partners. In the lawsuit, the plaintiff alleged that she was fired after questioning a $5 million sole source contract that the hospital awarded to Mohawk Medbury Corporation (MMC). DiEmanuele's husband, Tony DiEmanuele, served as president and CEO of MMC at that time. The court case is still pending.
