= Notify.gov =

Digital service provided by the United States Government

- Founded: 2023
- Dissolved: June 9, 2015
- Area served: U.S. government and customers
- Owners: General Services Administration (GSA); Technology Transformation Services (TTS)
- Services: Text messaging service
- Website: beta.notify.gov
- Commercial: No

Notify.gov was a text messaging service for government agencies in the United States to communicate with customers. Notify.gov was part of the Technology Transformation Services portfolio within the General Services Administration.

It is no longer in service as of June 9, 2025.

== Overview ==
The purpose of Notify.gov was to keep people "in the loop" on the status of their government applications via text messages. As a centralized government notification service, Notify.gov was intended to relieve users from "creating yet another separate account to get to some vendor-specific system."

Notify.gov was the initial pilot of the Public Benefits Studio, a team created to support the Biden Administration's Customer Experience Executive Order. The Notify.gov pilot was launched in 2023 with four state and local government agency partners, focused on the experience of "having a child and early childhood." It was built upon the GOV.UK Notify program and VANotify by the United States Department of Veterans Affairs. As of 2025, the beta product was available for all federal agencies as well as US state, local, territorial, and tribal governments.

In 2025, a GSA engineer resigned after being asked to provide access to Notify.gov's data to the new Technology Transformation Services director, Thomas Shedd. The requested data includes personally identifiable information for members of the public.
