= Suzette Kent =

American government official

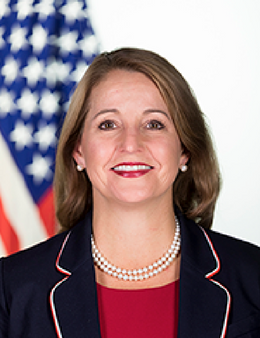

4th Chief Information Officer of the United States
- In office January 29, 2018 – July 2020
- President: Donald Trump
- Succeeded by: Clare Martorana (2021)

Personal details
- Born: Suzette Kuhlow
- Education: Louisiana State University (BA)

Suzette Kuhlow Kent is an American government official who served as Federal Chief Information Officer of the United States from January 29, 2018 until July 2020. She was the fourth person to formally hold the job of Federal CIO, which was created by the E-Government Act of 2002. The Federal CIO's office is a part of the Office of Management and Budget (OMB).

== Education ==
Kent earned a bachelor's degree in journalism from Louisiana State University.

== Career ==
Prior to her appointment as Federal CIO, she was a principal of the banking and capital markets advisory team at the Ernst & Young Financial Services Office in Dallas.

=== Federal CIO ===
Prior to her appointment, President Trump established the American Technology Council and issued the Presidential Executive Order on Strengthening the Cybersecurity of Federal Networks and Critical Infrastructure (Executive Order 13800) establishing, that it is "the policy of the United States to manage cybersecurity risk as an executive branch enterprise."

As CIO, Kent was responsible for setting federal IT policy and leading the Federal CIO Council, which is composed of CIOs from various federal government departments and agencies. Under the Federal Information Security Management Act of 2002 (FISMA), federal agency program officials, chief information officers, and inspectors general (IGs) are required to conduct annual reviews of each agency's information security program and report the results to the OMB. The effectiveness of FISMA to date has been flawed by several high-profile security breaches in systems that should have been subject to regular FISMA reviews, for example the 2014 and 2015 Office of Personnel Management data breach.

In June 2020, she announced her retirement the following month. The office remained vacant until filled by President Biden after the change of administration.
