= Login.gov =

Authentication system for US government services

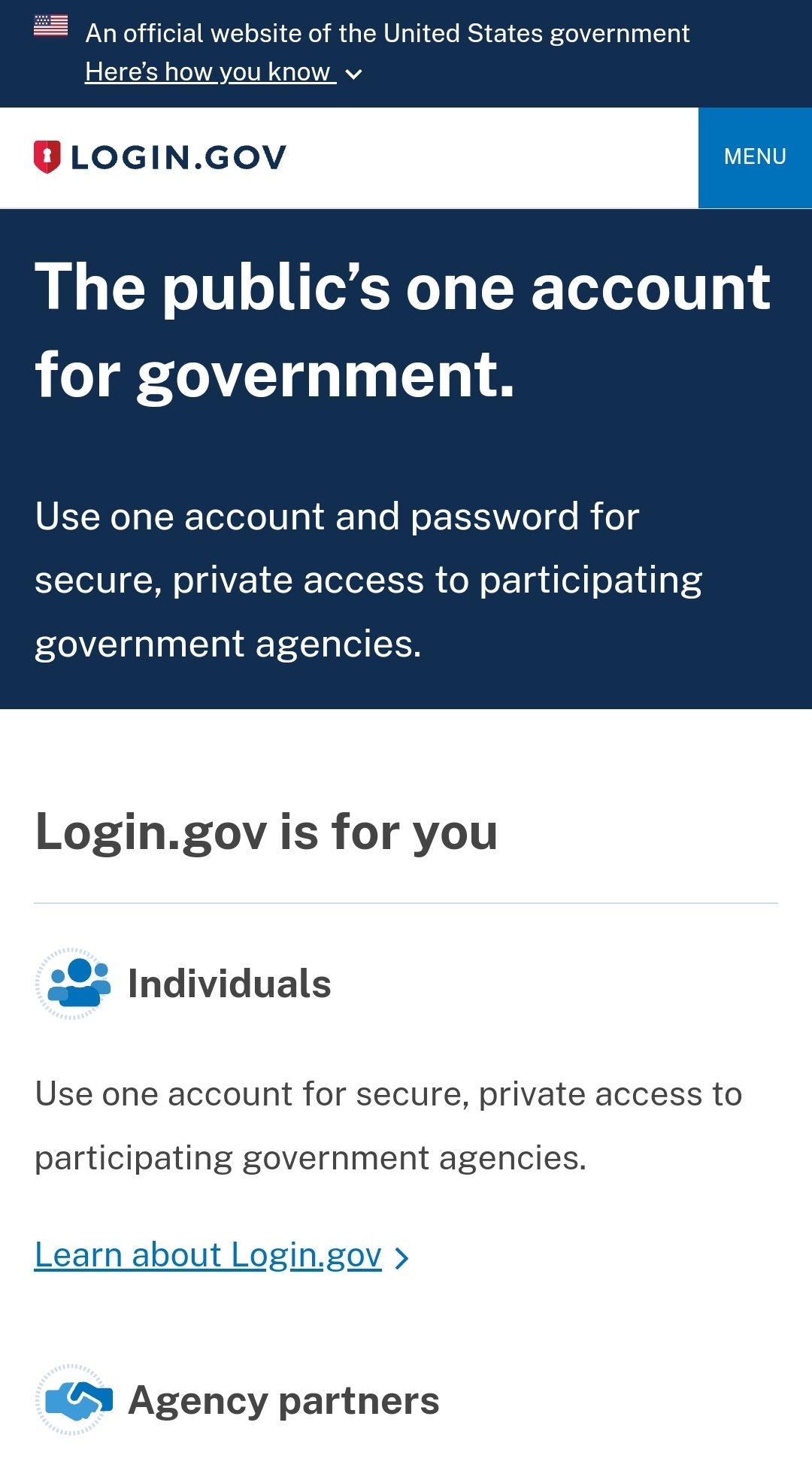
- Screenshot mobile screenshot of front page of Login.gov on 01-02-2024
- Website type: single sign-on
- Predecessor: Connect.gov
- Area served: United States Federal Government websites
- Owner: General Services Administration (GSA)
- Creators: GSA 18F and United States Digital Services
- Website: login.gov
- Launched: April 2017

Login.gov is a single sign-on solution for United States federal government websites. It enables users to log in to services from many government agencies using the same username and password. Login.gov was jointly developed by 18F and the United States Digital Service. The initiative was announced in a blog post in May 2016, and the new system was launched in April 2017 as a replacement for Connect.Gov.

== History ==
The idea for the site started at the direction of the Obama administration in May 2016, when an executive memo was sent out to executive agencies. The memo was to encourage agencies to use the same tools and technology for administrative services. By sharing these tools, there would be consistency in best practices and personal information security across the executive branch.

The service is authorized by law in 6 USC 1523: Federal cybersecurity requirements part (b) (1) (D):

"implement a single sign-on trusted identity platform for individuals accessing each public website of the agency that requires user authentication, as developed by the Administrator of General Services in collaboration with the Secretary."

== Partners ==
As of August 2024, Login.gov was used by nearly 50 agencies and states. The partners identified in a November 2025 Freedom of Information Act request were as follows:

Cabinet-level departments:

- Department of Agriculture
- Department of Commerce
- Department of Defense
- Department of Education
- Department of Energy
- Department of Health and Human Services
- Department of Homeland Security
- Department of Justice
- Department of Labor
- Department of State
- Department of Transportation
- Department of the Treasury
- Department of the Interior
- Department of Veterans Affairs

Other federal agencies, independent agencies, and government corporations:

- Administrative Office of the United States Courts
- AmeriCorps
- Central Intelligence Agency
- Environmental Protection Agency
- Equal Employment Opportunity Commission
- Federal Deposit Insurance Corporation
- Federal Reserve Board
- General Services Administration (including Technology Transformation Services)
- Library of Congress (including the U.S. Copyright Office)
- National Aeronautics and Space Administration
- National Archives and Records Administration
- National Credit Union Administration
- National Endowment for the Humanities
- National Geospatial-Intelligence Agency
- National Labor Relations Board
- National Science Foundation
- National Security Agency
- National Transportation Safety Board
- Office of Personnel Management (including USAJOBS)
- Peace Corps
- Pension Benefit Guaranty Corporation
- Railroad Retirement Board
- Securities and Exchange Commission
- Small Business Administration
- Social Security Administration
- Tennessee Valley Authority
- U.S. Agency for Global Media
- U.S. Agency for International Development
- U.S. House of Representatives
- U.S. International Development Finance Corporation
- U.S. International Trade Commission
- U.S. Office of Special Counsel

State governments:

- Arkansas
- California
- Colorado

== See also ==
- NSTIC
- ID.me
- GOV.UK Verify
