= 18F =

Digital services agency within the United States Government

Agency overview
- Formed: March 19, 2014; 12 years ago
- Dissolved: March 1, 2025; 20 months ago
- Headquarters: General Services Administration Building 1800 F Street NW Washington, D.C.
- Parent agency: General Services Administration (GSA)

18F was a digital services agency within the Technology Transformation Services department of the General Services Administration (GSA) of the United States government. 18F helped other government agencies build, buy, and share technology products. The team consisted of designers, software engineers, strategists, and product managers who collaborated with other agencies to fix technical problems, build products, and improve public service through technology. As part of wide-sweeping federal layoffs at the beginning of the second Trump administration that were carried out in connection with the Department of Government Efficiency, the agency was eliminated in March 2025.

== Overview ==
18F was an office of federal employees within the General Services Administration (GSA) that collaborated with other agencies to improve the user experience of government services by helping them build and buy technology. The group worked with government organizations to define a strategy and work towards a solution for their modernization efforts. 18F used agile and lean methodologies, open-source code, and user centered design approaches. 18F was co-founded on March 19, 2014, by former Presidential Innovation Fellows Greg Godbout, Aaron Snow, and Hillary Hartley.

18F's practices and methodologies influenced the creation of digital service teams across numerous state and local governments, including California, Colorado, New Jersey, Pennsylvania, Maryland, New York State, and major cities like New York City, Boston, and San Francisco. These teams often adopted 18F's approaches to agile development, user-centered design, and open-source practices.

In 2024, 18F consisted of approximately 90 distributed employees working remotely across the United States. The organization previously peaked at over 250 employees in 2018. While staff numbers decreased, 18F's influence grew through alumni who continued working in government technology, with 85% of departing staff in 2023 moving to other government technology positions.

Its name referred to its office location in northwest Washington, D.C., on 18th and F Streets. 18F was within Technology Transformation Services, part of the Federal Acquisition Service.

== History ==
In March 2014, a group of Presidential Innovation Fellows started 18F to extend their efforts to improve and modernize government technology.

The United Kingdom had created a similar agency in April 2011, Government Digital Service, following their own healthcare IT issues, which saves an estimated $20 million a year over previous methods. 18F runs on a cost recovery model where client agencies reimburse the digital agency for its work. 18F's creation was announced by GSA Administrator Dan Tangherlini on March 19, 2014, with a mission to simplify the government's digital services. The agency started with 15 employees, including 11 former Presidential Innovation Fellows from both the private and public sectors.

During its first decade, 18F worked on several hundred partner projects including enhancing access to national forests, publishing critical data about waterways, improving federal website accessibility, streamlining federal election contributions browsing, creating new case management systems for the judicial branch, and simplifying Medicare fund applications for states. Major initiatives included analytics.usa.gov, launched in March 2015, the U.S. Web Design System which standardizes federal website design, and cloud.gov which simplifies cloud adoption for government agencies. All of 18F's projects are open source, meaning anyone can review and suggest updates to the code.

=== Mass firings and elimination ===
At the end of January 2025, members of the Department of Government Efficiency (DOGE) started doing work at GSA, including questioning staff about their jobs without providing their own full names or answering questions. Wired magazine reported "an effort to use IT credentials from the Executive Office of the President to access GSA laptops and internal GSA infrastructure". Former 18F staff said that DOGE staff requested root access on 18F systems, which "was not normal".

In an all-hands meeting with the Technology Transformation Services (TTS) in early February, Thomas Shedd, the new TTS director and an associate of Elon Musk and DOGE, told 18F and TTS staff that "you all are one of the most respected technology groups in the federal government," saying the staff "are so key and critical to this next phase" of building federal software. Around the same time, Musk targeted 18F by tweeting "that group has been deleted" while also retweeting criticism of 18F being aligned with left-leaning politics. Another post Musk retweeted was from The Daily Wire writer Luke Rosiak proclaiming 18F was “a far-left agency that viciously subverted Trump during his first term."

On March 1 at 1am Eastern Standard Time (EST), Shedd sent an email to all 18F staff, describing them as "non-essential" and "non-critical", and eliminated the office "under direction from the White House". The email with the news indicated that more TTS programs will be impacted. The former employees of 18F said in a joint statement that they had been abruptly locked out of their computers and email at midnight EST, with "no chance to assist in an orderly transition in our work." The 18F website was taken offline the same day. Within hours of receiving the reduction in force notice from Shedd on Saturday, employees of 18F created a website, archiving some of the guides and resources other parts of government could use on 18F.org and stating "We came to the government to fix things. And we're not done with this work yet."

Frank Langfitt, an NPR national correspondent, reflecting on whether 18F was eliminated because of their politics and inclusivity, stated, "if Elon Musk suggests that this decision might have been made because employees seemed too liberal, it makes it hard for the government to argue otherwise." Brian Merchant, technology reporter, stated "It's the termination and removal of an entire office operating within the federal government on what appears to be the basis of its politics and its demography. No pretense made about performance deficiencies, or that this is about anything other than malice and punishment." Reporting also shows that 18F's role in safeguarding against unchecked technology spending may have also prompted the elimination with one previous employee stating, "Our whole approach was saving the government money and time, and building good quality public services. We never had an incentive to upsell."

Dan Tangherlini, who had previously overseen 18F when he was the GSA administrator, commented on the decision, saying "These were smart, technical, caring, dedicated, and patriotic public servants. Their dismissal with a late-night email demonstrates that this administration either doesn't know how to effectively enhance government efficiency, or really doesn't care." Businessman Mark Cuban suggested that the former employees start a consulting firm, saying that they'd soon be needed "to fix the mess" that DOGE will "inevitably create". While reporting on the events, The New York Times stated the 18F unit represented lost efficiency in the government by stating, "fixed technical problems and built products aimed at increasing efficiency for various federal agencies."

Despite the formal 18F office being "eliminated" by Elon Musk and DOGE, former staff redeployed the resources that were previously hosted on 18.gsa.gov so they can still be used.

In August 2025, following President Donald Trump's "America by Design" executive order, former USDS co-founder Erie Meyer wrote that the goals of the executive order contradicted DOGE's firing of top designers at 18F and USDS.

=== Appeal ===
On May 28, 2025, former 18F staff filed an appeal to the United States Merit Systems Protection Board (MSPB) stating that they were targeted because of "whistleblowing about DOGE's improper access to systems," perceived political affiliations, and the overreach of Elon Musk. Lindsay Young, former Director and is involved in the appeal, stated, "In government, it's just so much easier to tear things down than it is to build things up."

== Projects and impact ==
18F developed several notable initiatives that became independent programs within the federal government. The U.S. Web Design System (USWDS), created in 2015 through collaboration between 18F and the U.S. Digital Service, provides a design system for federal websites. The USWDS was developed with input from multiple agencies including the Consumer Financial Protection Bureau, Food and Drug Administration, Department of Veterans Affairs, Social Security Administration, Department of Education, Internal Revenue Service, and GSA. It is now maintained by GSA's Technology Transformation Services' Office of Solutions.

Three other major platforms initially developed by 18F became independent programs within GSA's Technology Transformation Services:

- Cloud.gov, which emerged from 18F's early need to solve cloud operations bottlenecks, offers cloud hosting services for federal agencies. Initially prototyped by 18F, it evolved into an independent service helping government agencies deliver digital services efficiently while meeting security and compliance requirements.
- Login.gov, which launched in 2017 as a shared service, provides secure access to participating government websites. Originally incubated as an 18F project in 2016, it was developed in partnership with the United States Digital Service and now operates independently within TTS.
- Analytics.usa.gov, created through a collaboration between GSA's Digital Analytics Program, based on unified Google Analytics data for many .gov domains.

=== Other notable projects ===
- Working with the United States Digital Service to support the Internal Revenue Service and Department of the Treasury Direct File project that provides many taxpayers with a free, online, step-by-step tool for filing taxes on directfile.irs.gov.
- Building weather.gov with the National Oceanic and Atmospheric Administration to help members of the public and emergency managers find, understand, and act on weather information and guidance.
- Streamlining the U.S. Department of Justice Civil Rights Division’s civil rights violation complaint submission process.
- Launching get.gov with CISA, allowing government organizations at all levels in the United States request .gov domains. Overall, more than 11,000 government organizations use .gov domains.
- Supporting a new case management system for the U.S. Tax Court which makes it easier for many taxpayers to submit online petitions.
- Creating a De-risking Guide to help both federal and state agencies avoid pitfalls in delivering successful custom technology projects.
- Building ClimateCorps.gov to make it easier for any American to find work tackling the climate crisis, alongside AmeriCorps and USDS.
- Launched Notify.gov, a text messaging service that helps government agencies communicate with people.
- Working on COVIDtests.gov, which enabled Americans to order free COVID tests from the government.
- Creating the U.S. Web Design System along with the United States Digital Service and 10x

== Legacy and influence ==
18F's impact on government technology extended beyond its direct projects. By 2024, its practices and methodologies had influenced the creation of digital service teams across numerous state and local governments, including California, Colorado, New Jersey, Pennsylvania, Maryland, New York State, and major cities like New York City, Boston, and San Francisco. The organization helped transform how government approached technology procurement and development.

Along with the United States Digital Service, 18F was part of a broader movement to modernize government technology and improve the public's experience with federal services. Key aspects of this transformation include:

- Promoting open source development in government
- Introducing user-centered design practices
- Establishing agile development methodologies
- Creating models for bringing technology talent into government service

18F's influence continued through its alumni network, with 85% of departing staff in 2023 moving to other government technology positions, spreading modern technology practices throughout government.

== See also ==
- Civic technology
- Service design
- Technology Transformation Services
- United States Digital Service, at the Executive Office of the President
- Government Digital Service, for the UK's counterpart
- United States federal government targets of Elon Musk § GSA
- Technology Modernization Fund
- 2025 United States federal mass layoffs
