= United States Digital Service =

United States government agency

Agency overview
- Formed: August 11, 2014
- Headquarters: 736 Jackson Place, Washington, D.C., United States; 38.899614°N 77.038026°W
- Agency executive: USDS Administrator
- Parent department: Executive Office of the President of the United States, Office of Management and Budget
- Website: www.usds.gov

The United States Digital Service (USDS) is a technology unit housed within the Executive Office of the President of the United States and established by congressional appropriations. The agency is known for modernizing federal government services. The agency was established by the Obama administration on August 11, 2014, in response to issues regarding the HealthCare.gov website.

On January 20, 2025, the agency was reorganized by the second Trump administration to align with the Department of Government Efficiency (DOGE). Part of this included renaming the agency to the "U.S. DOGE Service" to advance the administration's goals for modernizing federal technology.

USDS should not be confused with DOGE, which is a separate temporary organization that expired on July 4, 2026. In November 2025, the U.S. Office of Personnel Management stated that DOGE "didn't exist" with eight months left on its charter. These comments are referring to DOGE no longer being a centralized agency, but rather institutionalized.

== History ==
The USDS was launched on August 11, 2014, by then-president Barack Obama, inside the Office of Management and Budget within the Executive Office of the President. It provides consultation services to federal agencies on information technology. The agency's 2014 mandate was to improve and simplify digital service, and to improve federal websites. The mission of the agency is to "deliver better government services to the American people through technology and design."

Jennifer Pahlka joined the Chief Technology Office of the United States after having visited the United Kingdom's Government Digital Service, and she served as the U.S. deputy chief technology officer from June 2013 to June 2014. She helped found the USDS department. The HealthCare.gov technology crisis in 2013 accelerated the concept and served as one of the United States Digital Service's first projects.

The first United States Digital Service job application page was launched on January 20, 2015, during President Obama's State of the Union address. Ten years later, by 2025, the expertise field on the job application page included Accessibility, Administrative Support, Artificial Intelligence, Communications, Operations, Procurement Software Engineering, Product Management, Product Policy, Site Reliability/Production Engineering, Talent Management, User Experience, and more.

In 2021, Congress funded the United States Digital Service until at least September 2024. Appropriations for 2024 were extended into 2025 by continuing resolution.

In 2022, the federal government spent $100 billion on information technology, but the cloud computing systems have only garnered about $12 billion, as much of the expenditure is dedicated to maintaining legacy systems that lack the efficiency, capability, and security of newer architectures. The Obama office improvements were narrower in scope and largely symbolic in improving federal information technology.

The first head of the USDS was Mikey Dickerson, a former Google engineer who had previously been involved in the 2013–14 rescue of the HealthCare.gov website. He was succeeded by Matt Cutts, who held the position until April 2021. The third administrator of USDS was Mina Hsiang. During the Biden administration, Hsiang led the USDS in deploying a new website about COVID-19 vaccines.

== 2025 DOGE reformation ==
On January 20, 2025, Donald Trump issued an executive order reorganizing and renaming USDS as the United States DOGE Service, where DOGE stands for "Department of Government Efficiency". Trump subsequently appointed billionaire and SpaceX owner Elon Musk to manage the changed department. The executive order also established a temporary organization within the United States DOGE Service, called the U.S. DOGE Service Temporary Organization (USDSTO).

On February 14, 2025, along with other layoffs across the federal government, several dozen employees who were part of the United States Digital Service prior to the January 20 inauguration of Donald Trump, were dismissed with an email saying, "Due to the restructuring and changes to USDS's mission, USDS no longer has a need for your services." Of the remaining 65 employees in the department, 21 resigned with a joint resignation letter on February 25 that stated, "We will not use our skills as technologists to compromise core government systems, jeopardize Americans' sensitive data, or dismantle critical public services".

In August 2025, following President Donald Trump's "America by Design" executive order, former USDS co-founder Erie Meyer wrote that the goals of the executive order contradicted DOGE's firing of top designers at 18F and USDS.

In November 2025, USOPM stated that DOGE didn't exist any more.

== USDS activities ==
The USDS has created:

- A Digital Services Playbook, 2014 for improving digital government
- U.S. Web Design Standards, 2015 "to build accessible, mobile-friendly government websites"
- TechFAR Handbook, 2014 on federal contracting and procurement
- Discovery Sprint Guide, 2021 "to explain the discovery sprint process"

The USDS sends an annual report to Congress detailing projects and accomplishments. Its federal agency work spans across the Department of Veterans' Affairs, Department of Defense, Small Business Administration, General Services Administration, Department of Homeland Security, Department of Education, and Department of Health and Human Services. By 2024, it had worked with 31 agencies across the United States Federal Government.

By 2021, the United States Digital Service employed 215 people and was looking to expand further.

In 2024, the United States Digital Service sent an impact report to Congress indicating:

- 31 agencies have partnered with USDS since launch in 2014
- 900+ acquisition professionals from across 50+ agencies and subcomponents trained on effectively procuring and implementing modern IT/Digital Services from the Digital IT Acquisition Training Program since 2016
- 700+ digital service experts hired into the federal government to develop, modernize, and enhance the tools and systems the American public relies on
- 230 people serving at USDS in 2024
- 50+ USDS alums have taken new roles in federal service focused on delivering better government services
- Providing 18.25 million Veterans access for health and benefit services and increased Veterans trust in the VA by 9% to 79.3%
- 749 million free COVID-19 tests delivered to the American public
- Over 400,000 eligible children across 29 states regained Medicaid coverage
- 130% increase in Affordable Connectivity Program enrollment to reach 23 million households after USDS engagement
- 400,000 hours of COVID-19 testers time was saved
- 60% increase of in-stock rates of infant formula from the historic low of 19% in 2022
- $285 million in projected estimated savings over five years in infrastructure expenses for the Social Security Administration
- 400,000 working hours saved for frontline COVID-19 testers from 2020 to 2022 across 45+ local, state, tribal, and territorial public health department

=== Accomplishments ===
- For Health and Human Services, COVID-19 vaccine finder tools were created that included two websites, a chatbot, and a multilingual call center. These helped people find life-saving vaccines. With over 184 million visitors to Vaccines.gov and Vacunas.gov. These websites were operated by the Centers for Disease Control and Prevention.
- The USDS modernized the way the U.S. government buys technology. A program was launched that trains contracting officers on best practices and how to purchase modern technology, which helps projects be delivered on time, under budget, and designed with the end user in mind. 400 people graduated from the Digital IT Acquisition Professional Training Program by the end of FY 2020. 9 agencies received better contracts due to these courses. The USDS also helped educate families about the earned income tax credit and child tax credit via ChildTaxCredit.gov, which over 41,000 users used as a tool to find free tax filing services and receive expanded tax benefits. This encouraged families to file a tax return and contributed to a 25% reduction in food insecurity among low-income families. The USDS also helped change the way technical talent is hired by the government. A new hiring process was championed that used fair and open access for all applicants, while shortening the hiring timeline, and ensuring those hired were qualified.
- The USDS and the Office of the Chief Technology Officer together built the new VA.gov website for the Veterans Affairs, which was built in 2018, with the input over 5,000 veteran, service members, and family members. Customer satisfactions for using the VA.gov website rose on average from 53 to 69%, the website at one time had over 1.7 million logins per month.
- Homeland Security worked with the USDS to build a digital system to allow immigrants to apply and track applications online, and process them digitally. This led to 100% of naturalization applications being processed electronically.

Other Digital Services were created and modeled after the United States Digital Service:

- Florida Digital Service, created in 2020
- Colorado Digital Service, 2019
- New Jersey Office of Innovation, 2018

== Value set of USDS ==
In 2016, the United States Digital Service officially released a set of values:

- Hire and empower great people.
- Find the truth. Tell the truth.
- Optimize for results, not optics.
- Go where the work is.
- Create momentum.
- Design with users, not for them.

== Other related organizations ==
- 18F, at the General Services Administration
- United States Digital Corps
- United States Tech Force
- Government Digital Service of the Government of the United Kingdom
