= Crossroads =

A crossroads (junction) is a place where two roads cross.

Crossroads, crossroad, cross road(s) or similar may also refer to:

== Film and television ==
=== Films ===
- Crossroads (1928 film), a 1928 Japanese film by Teinosuke Kinugasa
- Cross Roads (film), a 1930 British film by Reginald Fogwell
- Crossroads (1937 film), a Chinese film starring Zhao Dan
- Crossroads (1938 film), a French mystery film directed by Curtis Bernhardt
- Crossroads (1942 film), an American mystery film starring William Powell and Hedy Lamarr
- The Crossroads (1942 film), a French drama directed by André Berthomieu
- The Crossroads (1951 film), an Italian crime film by Fernando Cerchio
- The Crossroads (1952 film), an Argentine film
- The Crossroads (1959 film), a French-Spanish drama by Alfonso Balcázar
- Crossroads (1976 film), a short film by Bruce Conner
- Crossroad, a 1976 Hong Kong-Taiwanese film by Chin Han
- Crossroads (1986 film), starring Ralph Macchio
- The Crossroad, a 1988 documentary by Ivars Seleckis
- Crossroads (2002 film), starring Britney Spears
- Crossroads: A Story of Forgiveness, a 2007 film starring Dean Cain
- Crossroad (film), a 2017 Indian Malayalam-language anthology film

=== Television ===
==== Series ====
- Crossroads (1955 TV series), a 1955–1957 American anthology series centered on the lives of members of the clergy of various religious denominations
- Crossroads (1992 TV series), a 1992–1993 American drama series following a Manhattan attorney and his son touring America by motorbike
- Crossroads (British TV series), a British soap opera that aired from 1964 to 1988 and 2001–2003
- Crossroads (Israeli news program) on Israel's Channel 14, broadcast from Times Square in New York City and anchored by Tal Heinrich
- Crossroads (Kazakhstani TV series), a soap opera
- CMT Crossroads, a 2002 American television program pairing country music artists with musicians from other genres

==== Episodes ====
- "Crossroads" (Band of Brothers), 2001
- "Crossroads" (Battlestar Galactica), 2007
- "Crossroads" (Dawson's Creek), 1998
- "Crossroads" (Jericho), 2006
- "Crossroads" (Stargate SG-1), 2000
- "The Crossroads", an AEW Dynamite special episode, 2021

== Literature ==
- The Crossroads (Ammaniti novel) or As God Commands, a novel by Niccolò Ammaniti
- Crossroads (book series), a high fantasy series of books by Kate Elliott
- The Crossroads (novel), a children's novel by Chris Grabenstein
- Cross Roads (novel), by William Paul Young
- Crossroad (manga), a 2003 manga series
- Crossroads, a series of Dragonlance novels
- Crossroads (play), 2009, by Bahram Beyzai
- Crossroads (novel), 2021, by Jonathan Franzen
- Crossroads, a limited series from First Comics

== Music ==
=== Albums ===
- Cross Road (album), a 1994 compilation album by Bon Jovi
- Crossroads (Tracy Chapman album) (1989)
- Crossroads (Eric Clapton album) (1988)
- Crossroads (Jerry González album) (1994)
- Crossroads (mind.in.a.box album) (2007)
- Crossroad (Masami Okui album) (2002)
- Crossroad (Calvin Russell album) (2000)
- Crossroads (Sylver album) (2006)
- Crossroads (1986 soundtrack)
- Crossroads 2: Live in the Seventies (1996)
- Crossroads: 2010, an album by Bizzy Bone
- Crossroads (2002 soundtrack)
- The Crossroads (album), 2024, by Cordae

=== Songs ===
- "Cross Road" (song), a 1993 single by Mr. Children
- "Crossroads", a 1998 song by Mercyful Fate, from Dead Again
- "Crossroad" (song), 2010, by Ayumi Hamasaki
- "Crossroads" (GFriend song), by GFriend from their 2020 extended play 回:Labyrinth
- "Crossroads" (Tracy Chapman song), a 1989 single by Tracy Chapman
- "Tha Crossroads", a 1996 single by Bone Thugs-n-Harmony, covered in 2002 by Blazin' Squad
- "Cross Road Blues", a 1936 blues song by Robert Johnson, later recorded as "Crossroads" by many other musicians
- "Crossroad", a 1995 song from E. 1999 Eternal by Bone Thugs-n-Harmony
- "Crossroad", a 2010 song by Iron Fire, from Metalmorphosized
- "Crossroad", a 2014 single by Au5 featuring Danyka Nadeau
- "Crossroads", a 1967 song by Gordon Lightfoot, from The Way I Feel
- "Crossroads", a 1971 song by Don McLean, from American Pie
- "Crossroads", a 1991 single by Calvin Russell
- "Crossroads", a 1993 song by LL Cool J, from 14 Shots to the Dome
- "Crossroads", a 2007 song by Labyrinth, from 6 Days to Nowhere
- "Crossroads", a 2008 song by Avenged Sevenfold from their compilation album Live in the LBC & Diamonds in the Rough
- "Crossroads", a 2011 song by Dead by April, from Incomparable
- "Crossroads", a 2013 song by Dethklok, from The Doomstar Requiem
- "Crossroads", a 2020 song by In Hearts Wake, from Kaliyuga
- "Cross Roads", a 2020 song by YoungBoy Never Broke Again, from album Top
- "Crossroads" (Daniel Žižka song), a song representing Czech Republic in the Eurovision Song Contest 2026, written by Daniel Žižka and Viliam Béreš

=== Other uses in music ===
- Crossroads (quartet), 2009 Barbershop Harmony Society international champions
- Crossroads (Sanjay Shrestha), a Nepali pop band founded by Sanjay Shrestha
- Cross Road (videos), a 1994 set of videos by Bon Jovi
- Crossroads Guitar Festival, a blues and rock concert arranged by Eric Clapton

== Organizations ==
- Crossroads (Cincinnati), an interdenominational church in Cincinnati, Ohio
- Crossroads Centre, an addiction rehabilitation facility in Antigua and Barbuda
- Crossroads Christian Communications, a media company and television network in Canada
- Crossroads Foundation, a non-profit charity based in Hong Kong

== Places ==
=== Australia ===
- Crossroads (medieval village), a medieval project in New South Wales
- Cross Roads, South Australia, a locality

=== United States ===
- Crossroads, Alabama
- Cross Roads, Delaware County, Indiana
- Cross Roads, Ripley County, Indiana
- Florence, Kentucky, formerly known as Crossroads
- Hustonville, Kentucky, formerly known as The Crossroads
- Crossroads, George County, Mississippi
- Cross Roads, Rankin County, Mississippi
- Cross Roads, Douglas County, Missouri
- Cross Roads, St. Francois County, Missouri
- Cross Roads, Stone County, Missouri
- Crossroads, Kansas City, a neighborhood in downtown Kansas City, Missouri
- Crossroads, New Jersey
- Crossroads, New Mexico
- Cross Roads, Pennsylvania, a borough in York County
- Crossroads, Tennessee
- Crossroads, Wayne County, Tennessee
- Cross Roads, Texas
- Cross Roads, Henderson County, Texas
- Surry, Virginia, formerly Cross Roads
- Crossroads, Bellevue, Washington, a neighborhood
- Crossroads, Monongalia County, West Virginia
- Crossroads Village (Michigan), a county park near Flint, Michigan

=== Other places ===
- Cross Roads, West Yorkshire, England
- Cross Roads, Jamaica, a neighbourhood of Kingston
- Crossroads, Cape Town, South Africa
- Crossroads, County Donegal, Ireland

== Other uses ==
- Crossroads (junction), where two or more roads converge
- Crossroads (folklore), a symbolic location often used in folklore
- Crossroads (mural), a public artwork in Indianapolis, Indiana, US
- Crossroads (mythology), a site of supernatural contact or events
- Crossroads (Umbanda), a syncretic Afro-Brazilian religion
- Crossroads Movement, which gave rise to the International Churches of Christ
- Operation Crossroads, the 1946 atomic bomb tests at Bikini Atoll
- Crossroads, a 1987 Commodore 64 game
- Crossroads, an intersection management system for self-driving cars
- The Crossroads (Portage, Michigan), a shopping mall in Portage, Michigan

== See also ==
- Crossroads Church (disambiguation)
- Crossroads Mall (disambiguation)
- Crossroads School (disambiguation)
- Burial at cross-roads, a place where executed criminals and suicides were traditionally buried
- Carrefour (English: Crossroads), an international supermarket chain founded in France
- Fork in the road (disambiguation)
