= Response to the Department of Government Efficiency =

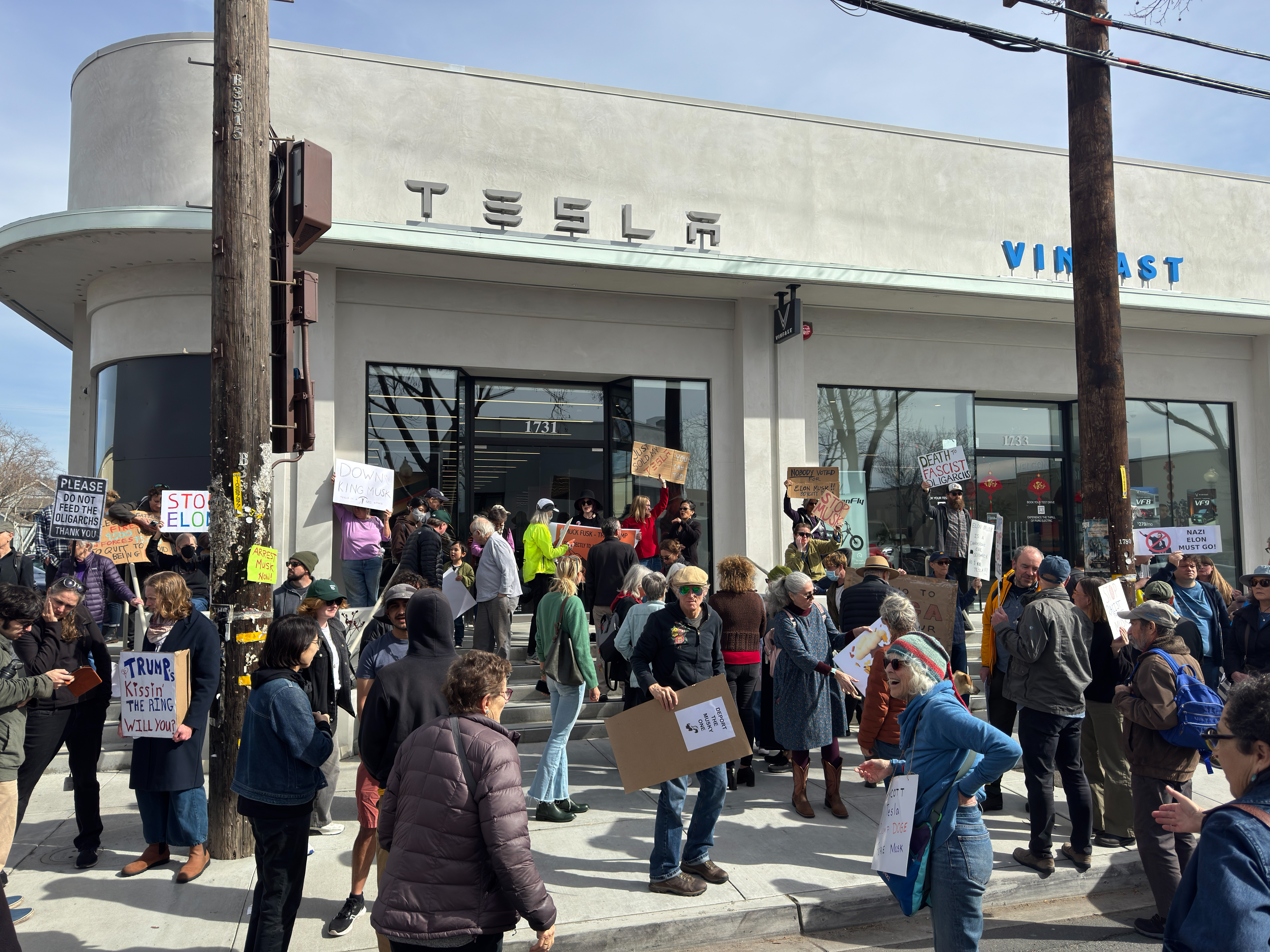
Anti-Musk protest at the Berkeley, California, Tesla showroom, February 2025

The actions of the Department of Government Efficiency (DOGE) have attracted reactions from officials, scholars, and citizens. While a majority supports the creation of an agency dedicated to efficiency efforts, most opinion polls show opposition to DOGE and Elon Musk, as of March 2025. Representatives created task forces to support DOGE efforts to cut waste. Countrywide protests have been organized to oppose mass layoffs, service cuts, privatization, and data extraction; United States Digital Service employees have resigned in protest. Various groups have sued DOGE, Musk, and the Trump administration.

Supporters have emphasized the need for efficiency and fiscal responsibility; they have expressed hope that DOGE will cut down on wasteful spending. Unitary executive theory advocates argue that the bureaucracy forms a "fourth branch of government" that should be bent to the president's will. Critics have spoken of a corporate coup of the US government by an entity they deem unaccountable and unconstitutional. Security experts have pointed to national security and cybersecurity risks created by DOGE teams rushing into critical infrastructure. Potential conflicts of interest have been raised about Musk and his associates: with government contracts that clash with federal regulators, which DOGE is trying to slash. The administration suggested that Musk would recuse himself if his interests conflicted. DOGE has been accused of pursuing a symbolic culture war rather than targeting wasteful spendings. Multi-billion-dollar mistakes have been reported in savings DOGE claimed.

== Public opinion ==
On January 24, 2025, the AP-NORC Center for Public Affairs Research published poll results showing that 39% of Americans disapprove and 29% approve of DOGE, while 52% hold an unfavorable opinion of Musk.

On February 23, Axios reported that multiple polls showed that a majority of Americans disapprove of DOGE's dissection of the government and of the amount of power Musk has gained. A February 24 poll of 2,443 American voters from Harvard Caps/Harris found that 72% of respondents supported the existence of an organization focused on cutting government waste; 60% of respondents answered that they believed DOGE was helping to make major cuts to federal spending; 58% said DOGE employees should not have access to sensitive information on Americans who benefit from government expenditure programs, including names, social security numbers, addresses, and incomes. A February 2025 poll of 1,000 American voters from Napolitan News Service found that 47% of respondents supported DOGE's cuts, 39% were opposed, and 13% were unsure. A survey at the end of February by Axios and Generation Lab found that 71% of voters under the age of 35 disapproved of DOGE's actions.

On March 2, CBS/YouGov released the results of a survey showing that 27% of Americans (17% of Democrats, 25% of Independents, and 39% of Republicans) believe that DOGE should have a lot of influence over government operations and spending; the majority (52%) believes that DOGE and Musk have too much access to government data records.

On April 20, a University of Massachusetts Amherst poll showed a majority did not trust Musk to identify federal programs to cut (53%), protect citizen privacy (55%), or avoid conflict of interests (59%); a majority of Americans (56%) believe that Musk has too much influence over the federal government.

In April, a Washington Post and Ipsos poll showed that over two thirds of Americans are concerned about DOGE data access.

== Mobilization ==
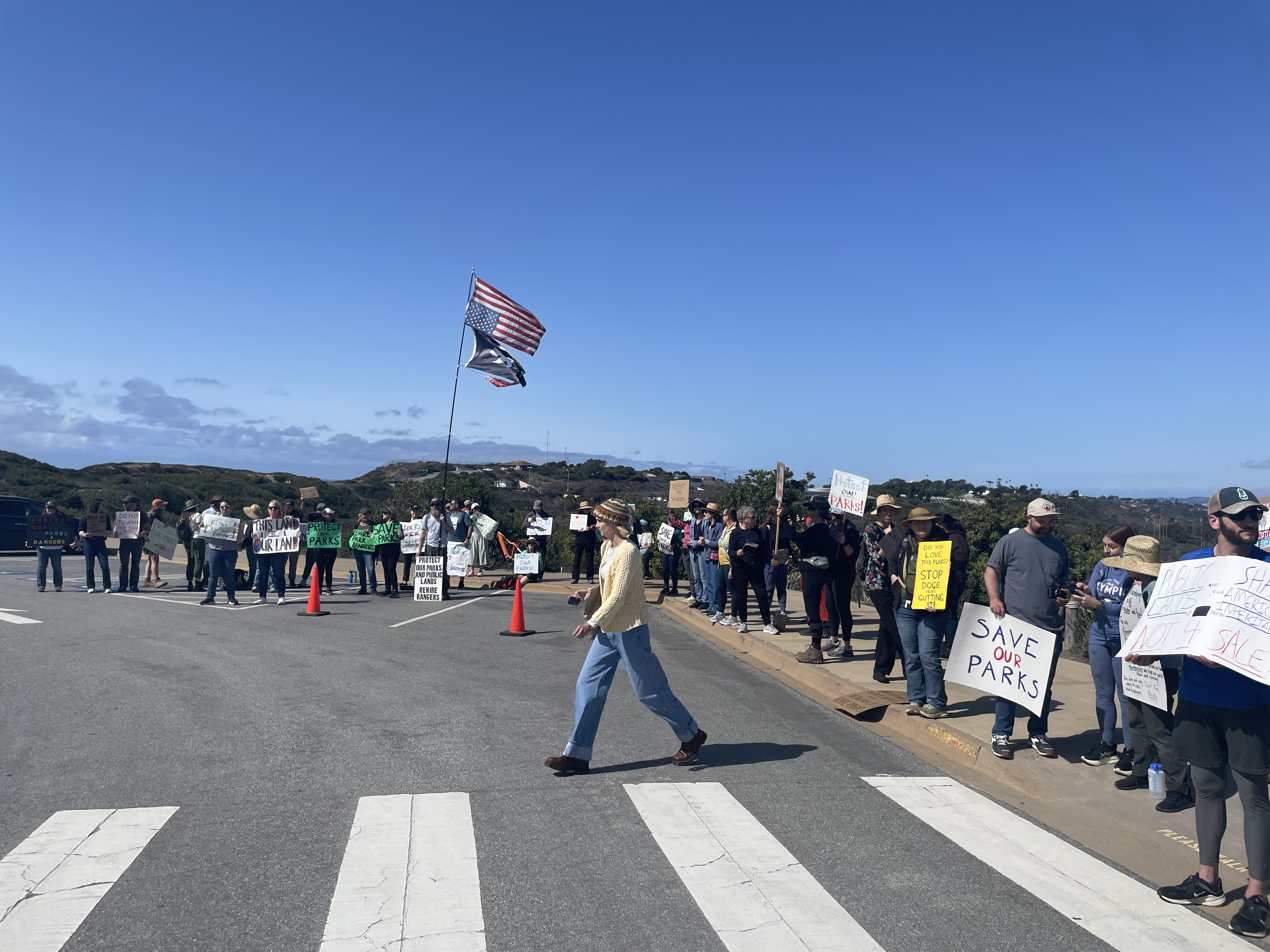
Protestors at Cabrillo National Monument protesting cuts to the National Park Service in March 2025

=== Caucuses and committees ===
On November 19, 2024, Rep. Aaron Bean (R-FL) and Rep. Pete Sessions (R-TX) launched the congressional Delivering Outstanding Government Efficiency Caucus (DOGE Caucus) to reduce waste, fraud, and abuse in the federal government. House Oversight Committee chairman James Comer (R-KY) announced plans two days later for a new subcommittee called the Delivering on Government Efficiency Subcommittee, which would be chaired by Rep. Marjorie Taylor Greene (R-GA). On November 22, Senator Joni Ernst (R-IA) was appointed to lead the corresponding Senate DOGE Caucus.

Several Democrats have expressed willingness to work with the Congressional Caucus, including Rep. Jared Moskowitz (D-FL), Rep. Tom Suozzi (D-NY), and Rep. Val Hoyle (D-OR). Others offered ideas: Rep. Ro Khanna (D-CA) on agency redundancies, online tax forms, fossil fuel subsidies, and IT systems; Rep. Greg Landsman (D-OH) on government form size; Rep. Ritchie Torres (D-NY) on permit processes; and Rep. Jared Golden (D-ME) on sending federal agencies back to states.

On December 17, the Congressional Caucus held its first meeting, with over 60 attendees, including Democrats Steven Horsford (D-NV), Hoyle, and Moskowitz. Lawmakers described it as largely organizational, with discussions about "low-hanging fruit", such as cutting remote work. The next day, Ernst proposed a "Drain the Swamp Act" bill, requiring agencies to relocate 30 percent of Washington, D.C., employees outside the metro area while restricting the ability to telework. Moskowitz proposed days later to make the Federal Emergency Management Agency and the Secret Service independent from the Department of Homeland Security. On February 5, Hoyle left the caucus, citing disillusionment with DOGE's goals: "it is apparent that [Musk] sees DOGE's work is to find funds to give tax breaks for billionaires at the expense of working people, not about doing right by them." The same day, Moskowitz voiced uncertainty on staying in the caucus, seeing no purpose; a week later he criticized the lack of collaboration between DOGE and the caucus: "Elon's been doing it all himself."

In May, Moskowitz declared the DOGE Caucus 'dead', saying, "We haven't met in months. We only had two total meetings in five months. And we weren't involved at all in anything [happening at DOGE], which Elon was in charge of." Moskowitz said he was told by the caucus co-chairs that DOGE would work with the caucus, but "None of it happened." Co-chair Aaron Bean said that the caucus was "just getting started".

=== State initiatives ===
In February 2025, Governor Ron DeSantis of Florida established the Florida Department of Government Efficiency, the first state-level equivalent of DOGE.

In April 2025, Governor Kevin Stitt of Oklahoma followed suit and issued an executive order to create an Oklahoma Division of Government Efficiency (DOGE-OK).

In April, Governor Greg Abbott of Texas launched an agency modeled after DOGE.

As of May 2025, there are more than 20 state-level DOGE organizations.

=== International initiatives ===
In June 2025, Reform UK announced the start of a DOGE-inspired initiative to identify and slash wasteful spending by councils.

The concept of a DOGE for the European Union has received support from European CEOs Tim Höttges and Patrick Pouyanné, as well as European Parliament member Axel Voss.

=== Protests ===
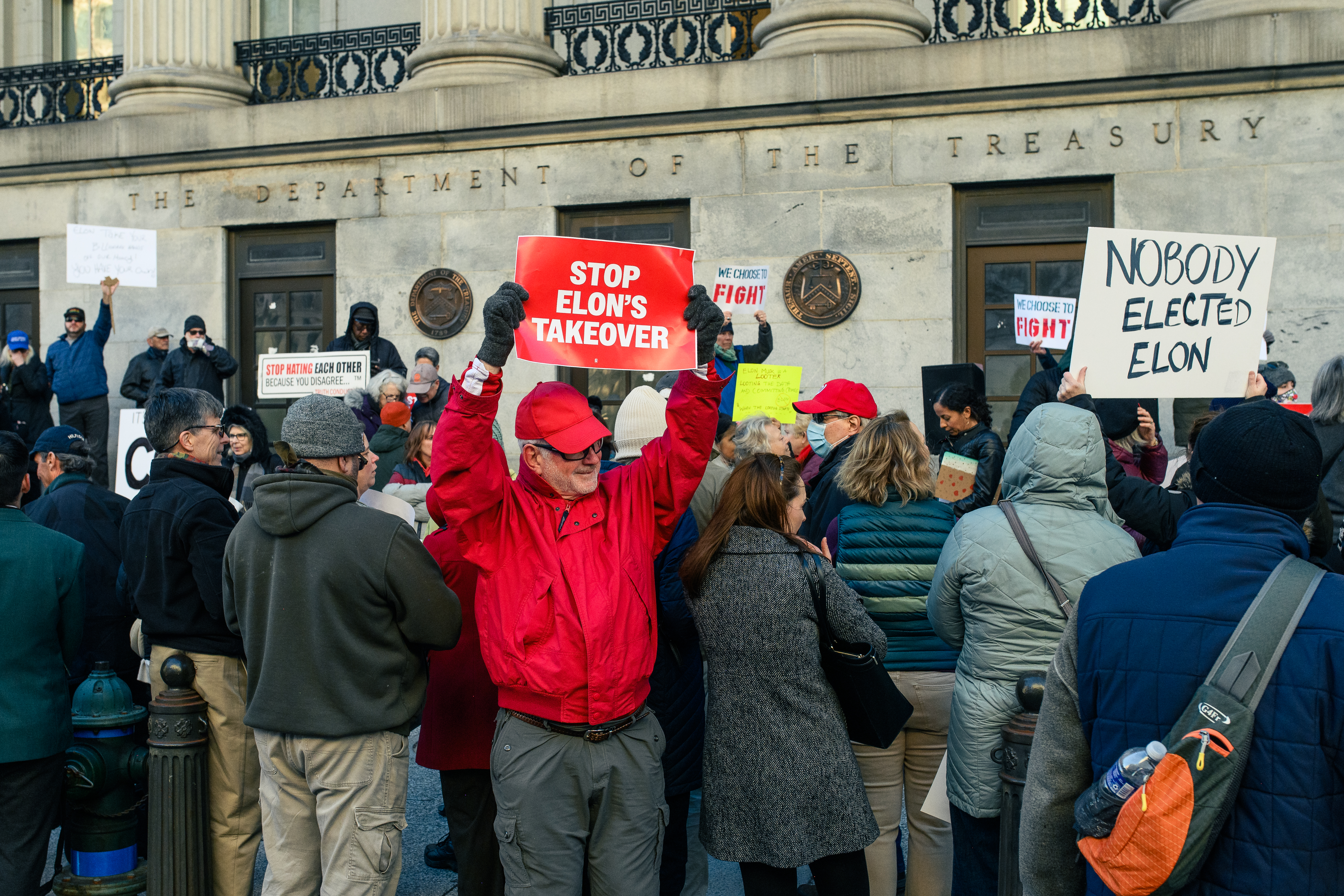
The "We Choose to Fight: Nobody Elected Elon" protest, organized by MoveOn, was held at the Treasury on February 4, 2025.

Several US Congress members spoke against Musk's role in the government during the "We Choose to Fight: Nobody Elected Elon" protest.

As of April 21, 2025, protests against DOGE are ongoing.

==== TeslaTakeover ====
Protestors appeared at Tesla showrooms in numerous cities in the US in February. One of the larger protests took place outside Tesla's Manhattan showroom, where protestors could be heard chanting "Elon Musk can go to Mars; we don't need your Nazi cars" referring to the Elon Musk salute controversy and Musk's support for Alternative for Germany. Protests also took place in San Francisco, Berkeley, Minneapolis, and Kansas City among others. Musician Sheryl Crow posted a video on social media showing a flatbed truck removing a Tesla she had sold in protest.

Protests happened outside Tesla stores nationwide in response to significant federal layoffs led by Elon Musk. Demonstrations have occurred in cities such as New York, Jacksonville, and Tucson, with participants criticizing Musk's role in implementing substantial cuts to the federal workforce. In New York City, nine individuals were arrested during a protest at a Tesla store, reflecting the intensity of public sentiment. The "Tesla Takedown" movement has gained momentum, with activists urging the public to divest from Tesla and participate in picket lines to challenge the administration.

==== Spoon emoji ====
In early February, employees at the Technology Transformation Services, a technology office within the General Services Administration, protested against Trump appointee Thomas Shedd during an internal meeting where he was encouraging staff to consider the deferred resignation program. Employees flooded the video conferencing chat with spoon emojis in opposition to Shedd, Musk and DOGE. Spoons were chosen in light of the initial email about the deferred resignation program, titled "Fork in the Road".

==== Stop the coup ====
On February 3, protesters gathered outside the Office of Personnel Management and indicated that they would continue to protest for the rest of the week in opposition to DOGE and Musk. The protestors claimed that Musk had illegally taken control of the government's infrastructure, and raised concerns that Musk was an unelected foreign national who was potentially stealing sensitive information stored in federal servers.

A rally was organized in front of the Treasury Department the next day via word of mouth and social media, with initially 50 participants that grew into hundreds. Participants included federal workers, retirees and others who were alarmed and angry over Musk and DOGE's actions and its trajectory, chanting "Elon Musk has to go" and signs reading "No Trump, No Musk, No Fascist USA" and "Musk owns Trump". Democratic politicians such as Senator Chuck Schumer, Senator Chris Van Hollen, and Representative Maxine Waters spoke out at the protest.

==== "Hands Off!" ====
About every day in April, millions of people across the United States organized as part of the "Hands Off!" protest. Protestor frustrations included Musk's involvement in government downsizing. The April protests converge toward a national day of action on May, 1.

==== Town halls ====
House Republican Rich McCormick was booed at a town hall in Georgia as he defended the administration's actions.

Many constituents turned out to town hall meetings held by members of Congress in February, 2025, and voiced their concerns and anger about the mass layoffs. The Republican leadership in the House of Representatives suggested that members stop holding town halls or use video town halls, as a means of preventing viral video clips of constituents confronting their representatives.

==== National parks ====
Several National Park Service employees at Yosemite National Park rappelled down the face of El Capitan, a 3,000-foot granite monolith in the park, and hung a 30-foot-by-50-foot upside-down US flag as a distress signal. The group stated "The purpose of this exercise of free speech is to disrupt without violence and draw attention to the fact that public lands in the United States are under attack. ... Firing thousands of staff regardless of position or performance across the nation is the first step in destabilizing the protections in place for these great places." On 1 March 2025 opponents of job cuts rallied in over 100 national parks across the US.

==== Stand for Science ====
A number of protests and national days of action, such as the March 7, 2025 Stand For Science rallies, have opposed funding and staff cuts.

=== Resignations ===
On January 21, DOGE representatives conducted interviews with USDS employees about their work and asked which colleagues could be fired. On February 25, 21 USDS employees resigned en masse. They were among the 65 US Digital Service employees who continued to work with the service when US Digital Service became the US DOGE Service. In a letter, they stated that could not honor their oath under DOGE, warned about the politicization of the department, and declared: "We will not use our skills as technologists to compromise core government systems, jeopardize Americans' sensitive data, or dismantle critical public services". One of the 21 USDS technologists who resigned in protest on February 25 stated that DOGE's actions created "a high risk of the American people's data being exposed or being utilized for nefarious means", including the potential for foreign actors to access that data, and she viewed these actions are "completely across the line both legally and ethically". The USDS is part of the DOGE structure by executive order.

On April 15, Politico reported that nearly everyone from the Defense Digital Service resigned, after being sidelined by DOGE.

=== Political involvement ===
On November 1, 2024, Musk mentioned that Ron Paul could work with DOGE; Paul vowed to join; they agreed on cutting military spending; this led nowhere.

On February 25, 2025, Politico reported: "Early interest in running for office is already beginning to rise — at least one major candidate recruitment organization saw a sharp spike of more than 2,000 new applications pouring in as Musk issued major actions pushing federal workers out."

On March 31, Sen. Ron Wyden, Ed Markey, Jeff Merkley, and Chris Van Hollen introduced the Privacy Act Modernization Act of 2025, which increases civil and criminal penalties for violations of the Privacy Act, strengthens court authority to prevent DOGE-like takeovers, modernizes the conceptual apparatus of the law by narrowing "routine use" exceptions, and limits information sharing.

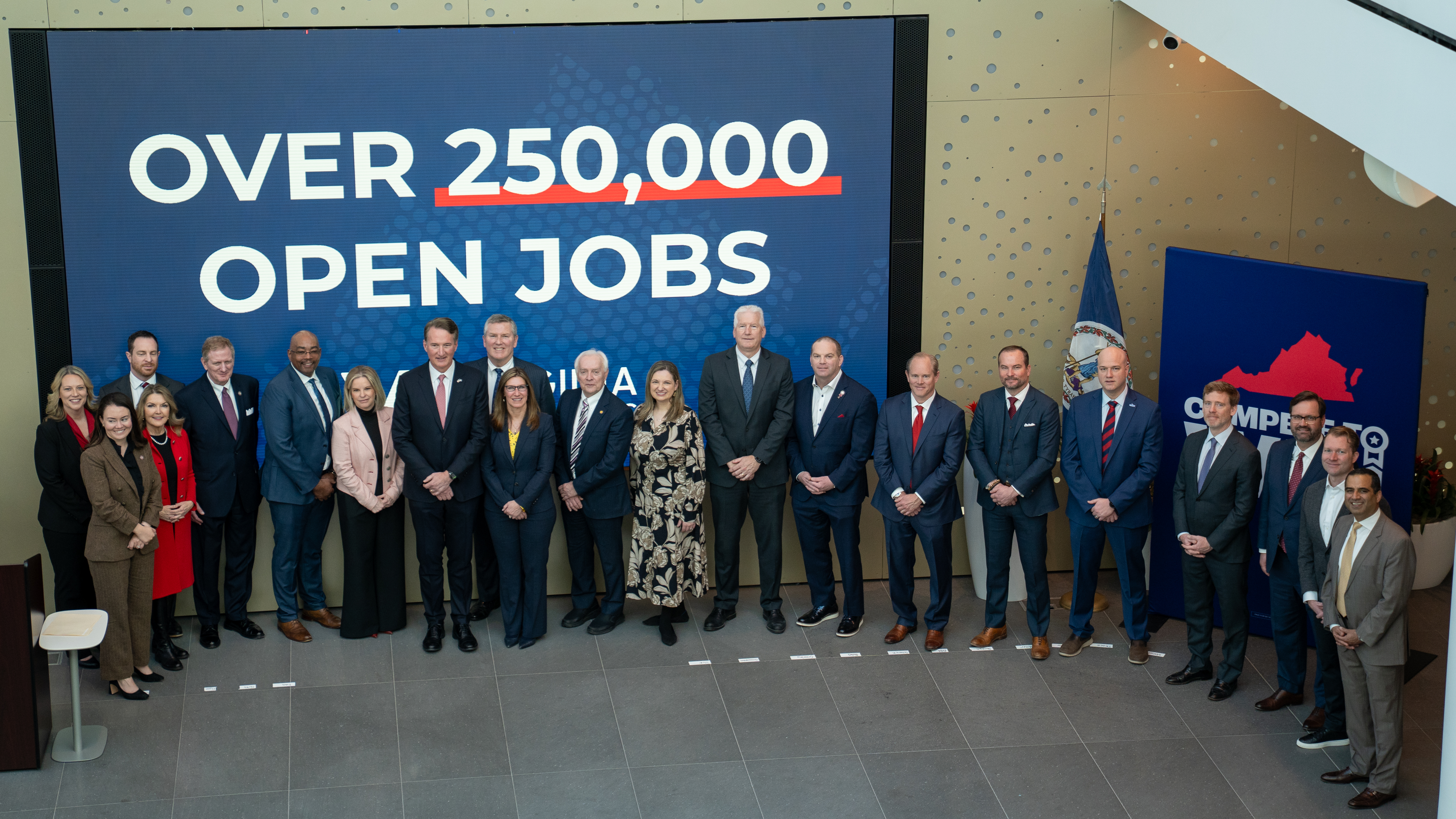
A Virginia Has Jobs event in McLean, February 2025

On April 3, Rep. Sara Jacobs introduced the Delete DOGE Act. In an interview on MSNBC she said: "This wholesale firing, this wholesale sort of gutting of these programs—that is not about government efficiency. That is about supposedly finding cuts so that they can fund the tax cuts for billionaires that they really want to pass."

In Virginia, Governor Glenn Youngkin created a program, Virginia Has Jobs, to help those impacted by federal layoffs find new employment. Youngkin has defended President Trump's firing of workers.

=== Running for office ===
Chuck Borges, who became a whisleblower while being the SSA chief data officer, is running for office.

=== Freedom Of Information Access (FOIA) requests ===
On March 17, two representatives from the House Judiciary and House Oversight committees filed a FOIA request questioning whether DOGE is operating outside the bounds of federal law and stated "the Administration and Mr. Musk have hidden behind a veil of secrecy as they systematically dismantle the federal government of the United States".

=== Letters ===
On January 10, 2025, Republican state governors wrote a joint letter to leaders of Congress expressing "overwhelming support" for DOGE and that they "stand ready to help DOGE—and Congress—be successful".

Sen. Elizabeth Warren (D-MA) has sent a letter to Musk with 30 ways to save $2 trillion in the federal budget: stopping waste at the Department of Defense, curbing Medicare insurers abuse, lowering prescription drug costs, cutting into the Federal Charter School Program, closing tax loopholes for the rich, etc. Her recommendations have been ignored.

On February 25, the Union of Concerned Scientists delivered a letter signed by more than 2,500 scientists urging Congress and the Trump administration to protect NOAA.

Nearly 50 lawmakers sent a letter to Russell Vought on April 16, raising concerns about privacy and security risks created by DOGE's use of federal data in unapproved AI systems; they also express concern about potential conflicts of interest involving Elon Musk, who owns an xAI.

=== Reports ===
Sen. Gary Peters released a report on September 25, 2025, that accused DOGE to operate "outside of, and even counter to, federal law and their purported efficiency and transparency goals" resulting "in serious cybersecurity vulnerabilities, privacy violations, and risk of corruption".

=== Internet resistance ===
Within one week of DOGE's mass layoff plan, the subreddit r/FedNews became a central hub for information sharing by federal government employees of DOGE actions and DOGE actors, and organizing resistance against the Trump administration. The subreddit gained 250,000 members between the 2024 United States presidential election and February 7, 2025, and entered the top 1% of subreddits by subscriber count. The subreddit states that it is unaffiliated with and not endorsed by the United States government. The subreddit describes itself as "a secure space for United States Federal Government employees to express their opinions, share experiences, and discuss news and information pertinent to their employment." Right-wing social media influencers have been critical of it, with unproven allegations of federal employees using Reddit while on duty.

On March 1, all the employees of 18F received notice that their positions had been eliminated. In response, the employees launched a website to explain how ill-advised was this DOGE decision.

The Union of Concerned Scientists has organized an online petition to pressure the House Oversight Committee in order to "end the secrecy of Elon Musk's campaign against federal workers".

On April 6, Musk left a livestream after repeatedly dying to the Path of Exile's first boss and receiving taunts from gamers, to which he responded: "there's a lot of retards in the chat".

After Musk demanded that federal employees email at hr@opm.gov, the Internet flooded its inbox.

=== Stunts ===
On February 14, 2025, three men wearing shirts that referenced DOGE attempted to gather information they claimed would be related to alleged wasteful spending and fraud from offices in San Francisco City Hall. The men brought flash drives to copy the records and entered public and private spaces through unlocked doors in the building. A building manager later announced that, "They did not present a judicial warrant, and therefore, had no authority to access computers or non public spaces." Employees refused to hand over any information and called the San Francisco Sheriff's Office, but by the time authorities arrived, the unidentified agents had fled the building. DOGE has not confirmed that the agents were with them, and the San Francisco Sheriff's Office believes that they were not.

On February 24, 2025, public televisions and monitors in United States Department of Housing and Urban Development offices displayed an artificial intelligence-generated video of President Donald Trump performing fetishistic foot worship upon Elon Musk, with the text "Long live the real king", in reference to Trump describing himself as a king days prior.

== Commentaries ==
In November 2024, Politico reported on growing concern from the tech world and several policy experts that the project was over-promising or could potentially tear down "much of the essential infrastructure that ushers along American innovation". Former US deputy chief technology officer Jennifer Pahlka stated that while civil service reform was needed, mass firings were the wrong answer. Senior fellow Jessica Riedl at the Manhattan Institute said that DOGE's plan to fire 25% of the federal workforce would reduce only 1% of federal funding and require the hiring of contractors to fulfill the difference. The Washington Post cited critics who stated balancing the budget would require higher taxes or cuts to Medicare or Social Security, and DOGE's proposal to slash federal programs that Congress funds but whose authority had lapsed would cut "veterans' health care, initiatives at the State and Justice departments and NASA, and multiple major antipoverty programs". The Post also cited budget experts who said Musk and Ramaswamy's plan "demonstrates the pair's misunderstanding of how the government works".

Laurence Tribe, constitutional scholar at Harvard Law School, argues that the power that Musk and DOGE attempt to exercise over federal departments is illegal. He asserts that Musk "absolutely" faces a conflict of interest in his roles as a government contractor and federal employee. Musk's software system takeovers raise "serious issues of privacy" according to Tribe.

Some business leaders supported the idea of the effort in the months before Trump took office. Many Republicans are supportive of DOGE's efforts to cut the budget. Some Republicans are concerned about DOGE, because its actions negatively impact their home states or are performed without transparency.

Trump's Commerce Secretary Howard Lutnick described DOGE's cuts as "backward", saying they focused too much on cutting the workforce rather than reducing waste.

=== Administrative concerns ===
==== Competence ====
Andrew Natsios, the administrator for USAID during the George W. Bush administration, told PBS that, "With all due respect, none of these people know anything about AID. What does Musk know about international development? Absolutely nothing. He has a bunch of young kids in their 20s. They don't know. They're techies. They don't know anything about international development. They don't know anything about the Global South. They don't know anything about these—the programs and policies of the agency. AID is the most pro-business and pro-market of all aid agencies in the world. I can tell you that categorically. I am a conservative Republican. I'm not a liberal. And I have served in repeated Republican administrations."

==== Efficiency ====
In September 2024, Jamie Dimon, the CEO of the bank JPMorgan Chase, stated that he supported the idea of creating DOGE to improve government competency.

DOGE has been seen as potentially redundant to the Government Accountability Office.

==== Savings ====
DOGE claimed in its "Wall of Receipts" on its website to have cancelled government contracts totaling about $16 billion. Roughly half of that was attributed to a single $8 billion contract with US Immigration & Customs Enforcement. The New York Times discovered the contract in question was actually only $8 million, making the total dollar amount of cancelled contracts dramatically less than claimed. DOGE claimed the $8 million figure was used in overall savings calculations all along, but the contracting company stated $3.8 million had already been spent, resulting in actual savings of $4.2 million. Meanwhile, the Daily Beast noted that other auditing irregularities are resurfacing, including taking credit for contracts already cancelled under the Biden administration. The Times reporting also noted that cancelled contracts are counted towards the Wall's total using the total value of each contract, even if a majority had already been paid by the government and the funds would not be recuperated. One of the biggest DOGE savings' claims was based on an error. A February 19 X tweet posted by the United States Treasury account, then reposted by DOGE, said that they had saved US$1.9 billion by cancelling a contract, and included a screen shot of the contracting agency code, associated with Centennial Technologies. The company told the Times that the contract was undertaken and completed in 2024 under the Biden administration and before DOGE was in place.

By February 22, the savings claim had deflated to $7 billion. The Wall Street Journal published an analysis of that claim and found that the savings "could be closer to $2.6 billion over the next year if spending levels remained constant—and about 2% of the funds would have gone to contracts related to DEI." It noticed the disappearance of two contracts from the site due to triple accounting, and observed that a quarter of the contracts published so far were already paid. The US Agency for International Development cuts were mistakenly counted three times, with DOGE reporting it as cuts amounting to US$655 million. This has now been decreased to US$18 million.

The DOGE site had originally posted that the total savings amounted to US$16 billion. By March 3, this numbered had declined to less than US$9 billion. A former employee at DOGE reported he found relatively little examples of federal waste, fraud, or abuse.

==== Human capital ====
Axios calls the events "Musk's takeover of Washington" and compares them to the events at Twitter, observing concerns about "brain drain" in both cases if highly knowledgeable workers leave. The events were also called a "takeover" by The Economic Times. The Associated Press reported that Musk had "created an alternative power structure" in the government.

During the House Ways and Means Oversight Subcommittee hearing on Internal Revenue Service modernization, Nina Olson, the director of the Center for Taxpayer Rights, described the deferred resignation offers as "coerced job cuts and firings" causing "a brain drain" at the IRS.

Tom Nichols assessed that "Musk's assault on expertise is coming from the same wellspring that has been driving much of the public's irrational hostility toward experts for years."

==== Dignity ====
On Saturday February 22, US Government employees received an email from the Office of Personnel Management asking them to provide a list of accomplishments from the previous week. Musk wrote on X that failure to reply would be taken as a resignation. The deadline for this response was set to 11:59pm ET on Monday February 24. The American Federation of Government Employees called the email and threat "cruel and disrespectful". Senator Lisa Murkowski (R-Alaska) responded: "Our public workforce deserves to be treated with dignity and respect for the unheralded jobs they perform. The absurd weekend email to justify their existence wasn't it." Senator Tina Smith (D-Minnesota) qualified the stunt: "This is the ultimate dick boss move from Musk - except he isn't even the boss, he's just a dick".

Commenting on workers who are at the cusp of retirement, retirement planner and CEO of Dugan Brown, Wayne Brown said: "You're talking about someone who's put in 25 or 30 years of their life toward a pension and health care and life insurance and benefits for life. This decision is causing a lot of real anxiety and real stress and real pressure among these people who, like these positions or not, dedicated their lives to serving their country in some capacity."

Conservative actor Zachary Levi, appearing on Fox News, was supportive of DOGE, but directly implored Musk to not terminate or fire federal workers who voted for Donald Trump, saying: "But there are good people, people that voted for Donald Trump who are losing their job. And we got to make sure that we don't leave those folks behind."

=== Economic repercussions ===
==== Markets ====
Columbia University professor Stijn Van Nieuwerburgh argues that the DOGE's fire sale of more than 500 government buildings could crash financial securities linked to commercial mortgages.

The Christian Science Monitor reported that, after the USAID freeze, contract lawyers are involved representing farmers selling surplus crops who are worried about future purchases, and business owners who received Department of Agriculture (USDA) grants to invest in renewable energy technology and climate-resistant crops are unsure if they will be paid. Brent Swart, president of the Iowa Soybean Association, says that suspending the USDA puts farmers at risk and jeopardizes programs that demonstrated public returns. Newsweek counted many TikTok accounts posting clips to express their anger or to discuss the link between the USDA freeze and Project 2025.

In March 2025, Tesla investor Christopher Tsai said that he hoped that Musk's involvement in DOGE would be temporary, arguing that his political activities have had negative repercussions on the stock market.

Investor Mark Cuban said on Bluesky that if "tariffs stay in place for multiple years, and are enforced and inflationary, and DOGE continues to cut and fire, we will be in a far worse situation than 2008", referring to the Great Recession.

==== Fiscal policy ====
In November 2024, Brian Armstrong, the CEO of cryptocurrency vendor Coinbase, spoke in support of the idea of DOGE, and has advocated for abolishing the income tax.

In March 2025, the IRS stated that staff cuts and disruptions caused by DOGE may lead to a tax revenue drop of 10% or $500 billion for the federal government.

In November 2024, Maya MacGuineas of the public policy organization Committee for a Responsible Federal Budget has said that $2 trillion in savings is "absolutely doable" over a period of 10 years, but it would be difficult to do in a single year "without compromising some of the fundamental objectives of the government that are widely agreed upon". Desmond Lachman of the American Enterprise Institute stated that "realistically, there isn't much political willingness to do the tough stuff that [needs] to be done to get the budget under control." Senior director for federal budget policy Bobby Kogan at the Center for American Progress said that $2 trillion in cuts would likely result in 33% cuts to Social Security, Medicare, and every program relating to veterans compensation and healthcare.

In December 2024, Douglas Holtz-Eakin of the American Action Forum compared DOGE to the former Grace Commission, which had none of its 150 proposals enacted. Chief economist Mark Zandi of Moody's said that 30% of the federal budget that is non-discretionary is at the lowest level in modern history as a percentage of GDP, and that even finding $200 billion of savings was highly unlikely. Bobby Kogan said that the "threat level for DOGE's recommendations making it through Congress is relatively low... My threat level for them doing some things illegally, unilaterally, is incredibly high."

In early February 2025, Business Insider estimated that at its actual pace DOGE would cancel around $67 billion in contracts each year. This corresponds to 3% of Musk's original $2 trillion goal. After having reviewed official data, The Economist discovered that Treasury outflows actually increased since DOGE took over. NPR investigated Musk's claim that DOGE is saving taxpayers billions, but could not trace back the contracts allegedly terminated.

On the All-In podcast, Larry Summers agreed that there was a need for reform, but predicted that DOGE will end in failure, telling host Chamath Palihapitiya: "We are firing, en masse, people whose job it is to audit people like you. And the result of that is that we are losing revenue directly". Studies showed that every dollar invested in auditing gets 100% in return and above, and tax specialists fired by DOGE said to have returned magnitude more revenues than their salaries; as John Koskinen, who led the IRS from 2013 to 2017 said: "when you hamstring the IRS, it's just a tax cut for tax cheats."

==== Privatization ====
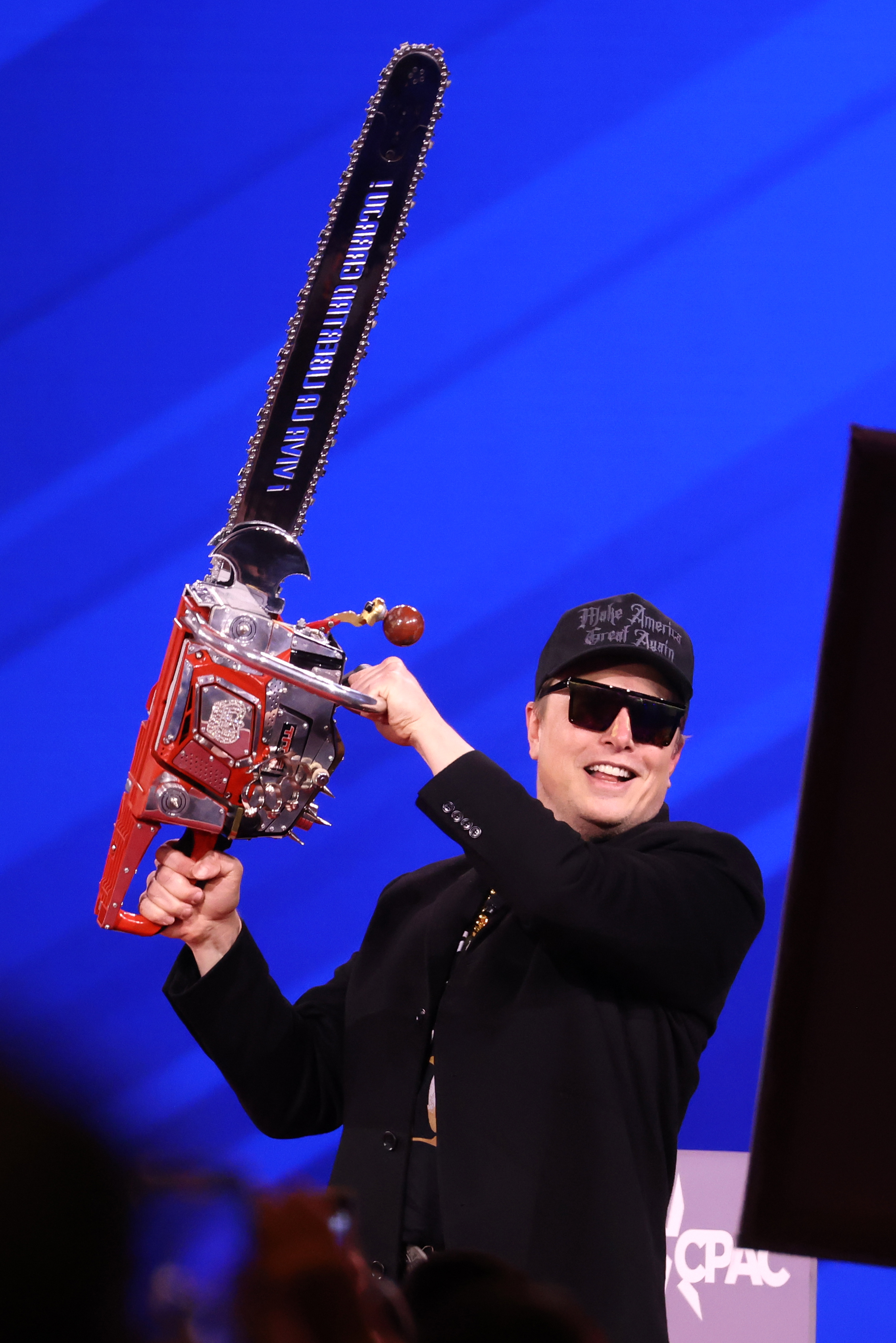
Musk swings the "Chainsaw for Bureaucracy" at CPAC 2025.

Sharon Parrott, president of the Center on Budget and Policy Priorities, said that DOGE could decimate social programs by stigmatizing them as wasteful. Speaking at a Morgan Stanley conference in March, Musk has said that "we should privatize everything we possibly can." Grover Norquist, who famously said not wanting to abolish government but to "reduce it to the size where I can drag it into the bathroom and drown it in the bathtub", cheered DOGE's cuts.

This privatization effort can be seen in the selloff of hundreds of office buildings, many of them historic. Lindsay Owens, the executive director of Groundwork Action, argues that DOGE is more a land grab than an efficiency initiative, and compares it to the Teapot Dome scandal. Columnist Rod Miller echoes that point by imagining a future where public land is no more.

=== Legal questions ===
Steve Bannon, a long-time Trump and Republican Party influencer, was extremely critical of Musk's DOGE program, saying "Musk is a parasitic illegal immigrant. He wants to impose his freak experiment and play-act as God without any respect for the country's history, tradition or values."

==== Tax law ====
Center for Taxpayer Rights executive director Nina Olsen questions DOGE's capacity to recognize fraud: a background in tax law is required; determination falls on the relevant authority; proving fraud requires an audit.

==== DOGE status ====
The leadership and membership of DOGE is unclear, as is the role of Elon Musk in government. Judges, journalists, and DOGE itself have drawn no clear distinction between Musk's employees, political appointees associated with Musk, and DOGE personnel.

On February 17, Judge Tanya Chutkan asked that Elon Musk's legal status regarding DOGE's actions be clarified. In response, the government stated that Musk "has no actual or formal authority to make government decisions himself" and that "he is an employee of the White House Office." Journalist Marcy Wheeler views this defense as a way to create retroactive continuity for DOGE. Wheeler also cites Ryan Goodman's evidence of times when Donald Trump and Elon Musk themselves contradicted the government position.

Kedric Payne, general counsel at the Campaign Legal Center, questions the ethics of Musk's role: "I don't see a legal way for Musk to lead DOGE in the way that it's been described and stay in compliance with the ethics rules".

The role of Steve Davis, a longtime associate of Musk, is also unclear. According to Wired, a former staffer at USDS asked managers if Davis was administrator or interim administrator, and was told that the status of Davis within USDS or DOGE was unknown.

Journalists have also noted that DOGE itself is amorphous. The Atlantic called it "a disembodied specter," observing that "much of the cost savings that Musk has touted as DOGE victories on social media have been carried out by other appointees." The New York Times notes that judges in numerous court cases have been unable to establish basic facts about the staff members who have targeted federal agencies: "Attempts to press for specifics, such as how many associates of Mr. Musk have been detailed to specific agencies, whether they have arrived as employees of those agencies or as representatives from the White House, and what grounds they have for demanding entry into agencies' systems, have been largely unsuccessful."

There is also ambiguity about what actions can be attributed to DOGE. The DOGE X account claimed credit for a $1.9 billion IRS contract rescinded "in connection" with DOGE. The contract was actually cancelled during the Biden administration.

==== Constitutionality ====
Democratic representative Zoe Lofgren (CA-18) has criticized DOGE, calling it "unconstitutional and illegal" in relation to its proposals regarding the impoundment of appropriated funds by Congress. Democratic representative Ro Khanna (CA-17) stated that he was "appalled by the unconstitutional efforts to block funding appropriated and authorized by Congress" and that he relayed those concerns to Musk. Independent Senator Bernie Sanders initially supported plans by Musk to cut defense spending. He soon opposed DOGE, calling its actions illegal and unconstitutional, and repeatedly criticized Musk.

Elizabeth Popp Berman, Richard H. Price Professor of Organizational Studies at the University of Michigan contends that DOGE could be using the payments system to overrule spending already approved by Congress and use this power for ideological control. The Impoundment Control Act of 1974 makes this illegal. How DOGE politicizes an apolitical process increases risks of corruption.

James Sample, constitutional law scholar at Hofstra University, questions the legality of DOGE's power centralization: "Musk manifestly answers only to Trump. Answering only to the President while wielding vast and enormous power is basically the Platonic form of a principal officer, thus requiring Senate confirmation".

==== Privacy ====
Danielle Citron, Jefferson Scholars Foundation Distinguished Professor in Law and LawTech Center Co-Director at University of Virginia School of Law, traces the Privacy Act of 1974 back to the commitment to "transparency, accountability, and protections around the collection, use, and sharing of personal data." The Privacy Law prevents any access to the systems of records of an agency without proper vetting and authorization. Citron concludes: "We are bearing witness to the kind of power grab, abuse, and overreach that the Privacy Act of 1974 was passed to prevent".

Under Trump's second administration, the Privacy Act has been cited in up to fourteen lawsuits pertaining to DOGE access to data that could contain sensitive personal data. Congressional leader Gerry Connolly stated "I am concerned that DOGE is moving personal information across agencies without the notification required under the Privacy Act or related laws, such that the American people are wholly unaware their data is being manipulated in this way."

Due to the recent lawsuits, Congressional leader Lori Trahan announced an effort to modernize and update the Act to address growing concerns about government surveillance, unvetted access, and misuse.

=== Political issues ===
==== Culture war ====
Jessica Riedl, a Republican and Manhattan Institute senior fellow on budget, tax, and economic policy, found that DOGE sought to satisfy Trump's culturally conservative base rather than targeting the biggest government spending sources. Riedl said: "So far, DOGE seems more about looking for symbolic culture war savings than truly reducing the budget deficit in any meaningful way". Alex Nowrasteh, Cato Institute vice president for social and economic policies, echoed the sentiment, describing the cost cuts as "to the federal government, it's nothing".

==== Conflicts of interest ====
Multiple news agencies have raised questions as to whether Musk's companies being contractors to the federal government causes a conflict of interest with their proposed work in DOGE.

Representative Greg Landsman described DOGE as "a way for the wealthiest person alive, who gets billions in federal money, to hack the federal government data and payment system at the expense of the American people". The National Reconnaissance Office signed a contract in 2021 for $1.8 billion with Musk's SpaceX. Journalist Malika Khurana lists 11 agencies impacted by DOGE with federal investigations or regulatory battles with Elon Musk's businesses. Investigative journalist Eric Lipton uncovered 32 investigations, complaints or enforcement actions into Musk's companies. On February 18, Reuters reported that Food and Drug Administration employees reviewing Musk's company Neuralink were fired by DOGE.

White House press secretary Karoline Leavitt said in early February 2025 that Musk would determine if his DOGE work presented a conflict of interest.

During a February 11 press conference featuring Musk and Trump in the Oval Office, Musk responded to a question about his potential conflict of interest by claiming that "all his team's efforts were being made public on DOGE's social media accounts and website." CNN host Anderson Cooper noted that: Musk has shown opposition to transparency by claiming that reporters investigating Musk's DOGE workers were committing crimes; that Musk himself has not made his conflict-of-interest forms public, and the White House says he won't have to; and that the statements issued on the DOGE X social media account are no more than "press releases". Later that same day, Trump fired USAID Inspector General Paul K. Martin, one day after Martin had issued a report finding that $489 million in food was at risk of spoilage because of the Trump administration's efforts to shutter that agency.

A ProPublica investigation found that DOGE staffer Gavin Kliger held up to $365,000 in shares of companies that could benefit from mass firings he oversaw at the Consumer Financial Protection Bureau; the White House denied Kliger's involvement in the mass firings. Experts on government ethics described his stock ownership as a conflict of interest.

==== Coup d'état ====
Several US Congress members spoke against Musk's role in the government during the "We Choose to Fight: Nobody Elected Elon" protests.

The "freeze of government function" was described as a coup d'état by Seth Masket, a professor of political science at the University of Denver, because "Musk is a private citizen taking control of established government offices." He notes that Musk has no role in government and questions the validity of DOGE, which is not a federal executive department, assuming power over established government agencies.

Author Jeet Heer argued in The Nation that the actions of DOGE were a "time-honored revolutionary tactic of developing dual power in order to seize control" and constituted a coup. Paul Krugman, an economist and columnist, stated on February 3 that the actions of DOGE might have as of that date constituted "what amounts to a 21st-century coup", and that he would update his opinion later. The Guardian stated that it agreed with Krugman.

==== Authoritarianism ====
The concept of DOGE also echoes earlier proposals like Curtis Yarvin's RAGE (retire all government employees), which advocates for the dismantling or "reboot" of the federal government. Much like DOGE, Yarvin's plan is rooted in a vision of a "radically gutted" government bureaucracy, but it goes even further in calling for the replacement of democracy with a more business-minded, authoritarian system, such as a dictatorship headed by a "CEO Monarch". Yarvin's ideas, which align with a broader neoreactionary philosophy, have found a significant following among certain conservative circles, with figures like Elon Musk and JD Vance appearing to embrace similar principles. The parallels between RAGE and DOGE raise concerns among critics, who argue that the push to reduce the size of the federal government isn't about efficiency, but rather serves to empower corporate elites and remove internal resistance to unitary executive power, especially from those with more democratic or liberal inclinations.

==== Accountability ====
Donald Moynihan, a professor of public policy at the University of Michigan, called Musk and DOGE's actions "concerning" and "unprecedented". Moynihan worries that Musk and his group, not really public officials, had been able to access sensitive government data, and that Congress had very little ability to monitor and intervene. He also added that "Musk's access to Treasury payment systems could give him undue influence over the federal budget at a time when there is a looming debt-ceiling crisis."

During a news conference at the Capitol on February 3, 2025, Senator Patty Murray (D-WA), the vice chair of the Senate Appropriations Committee, stated that Musk and his team were breaking the law. Murray stated that Musk was an "unelected, unaccountable billionaire with expansive conflicts of interest, deep ties to China" and accused him of hijacking the nation's financial systems and its ability to pay.

=== Security risks ===
DOGE had sought to control the digital systems of many US agencies. This poses security risks on many system vulnerabilities:

==== Archives ====
In April the DOGE social account posted about saving a little over $1 million by replacing magnetic tapes by digital backups, creating archival and security risks according to the community notes and experts.

==== Artificial intelligence ====
Allison Stanger argues that an artificial intelligence (AI) company (like xAI or Cognition AI) that accesses government data without public accountability could pose a threat. Training on large and longitudinal real data treatments, outcomes and costs across diverse population could topple the medical or the insurance industry and influence health care policy. An AI company with access to USDT data that tracks real-time transactions and money flows could help develop economic and financial forecasting models that would give an investment edge. "A private company with exclusive access to infrastructure data", Stranger contends, "could allow the company to develop "smart city" systems that city governments would become dependent on, effectively privatizing aspects of urban governance".

According to a Washington Post article, an official stated that Musk has a project of replacing the human workforce with artificial intelligence. Computer scientist Bruce Schneier dismissed Musk's alleged project as "cyber utopianism".

==== Defense ====
Richard Fourno, assistant director at University of Maryland Baltimore County Cybersecurity Institute, finds DOGE's activities, with little oversight over its employees' operational competence, "create conditions that are ideal for cybersecurity or data privacy incidents that affect the entire nation". James Goldgeier, Professor of International Relations at American University, and Elizabeth N. Saunders, Professor of Political Science at Columbia University, argue that "Musk's activities present a national security nightmare"

Employees from FAA's National Airspace System Defense Program have been notified of their termination by email from an Outlook address; the program manages long-range detection radars that secure the country's borders. Some of the fired FAA employees were working on a system announced by the Air Force in 2023 and partially funded by the Defense Department to protect Hawaii from cruise missiles. One fired employee whose position was supposed to be exempt from probationary firings due to the national security-related work he was doing believes he was targeted because of personal Facebook posts he made criticizing Musk's companies X and Tesla.

Hundreds of National Nuclear Security Administration workers have been fired; the administration is trying to hire them back. The US Department of Agriculture said it "accidentally" fired "several" employees working on the government's response to the avian flu outbreak and that it will "correct" the situation.

Bruce Schneier and Davi Ottenheimer argue that DOGE's hacking creates multiple threats: centralizing information breaks the principle of separation of duties; adding new servers brings new targets; modifying core systems exposes future gaps to be exploited.

== See also ==
- Lawsuits involving the Department of Government Efficiency
- 2025 United States government online resource removals
- Oligarchy
