= Crossroads Church =

Crossroads Church may refer to:

- Crossroads (Cincinnati), Ohio
- Crossroads Christian Church, California
- Cross Roads Church, Maryland
- Church of the Crossroads, Hawaii
- Crossroads Community Cathedral, Connecticut
