= Fork in the road =

Fork in the road may refer to:

- Fork (intersection), the point at which a road branches into two
- Fork in the road (metaphor), a metaphor for making a decision

== Film and television ==
- A Fork in the Road (TV series), a 1992–2006 Australian travel television series
- A Fork in the Road (film), a 2009 film directed by Jim Kouf

== Music ==
- "A Fork in the Road" (song), by the Miracles, 1965
- "Fork in the Road", a song by Lillix in their album Falling Uphill, 2003
- "Fork in the Road", a song by 1200 Techniques in their album Consistency Theory, 2004
- "Fork in the Road", a song by Jandek in his album Khartoum, 2005
- "Fork in the Road", a song by dead prez and Outlawz in their album Can't Sell Dope Forever, 2006
- "Fork in the Road", a song by The Latency from their album The Latency, 2009
- Fork in the Road (The Infamous Stringdusters album), 2007
- Fork in the Road, an album by Neil Young, 2009

== Other ==
- "Fork in the Road", a 2025 memo to US federal government employees offering deferred resignation

== See also ==
- Forks of the Road (disambiguation)
- Fork (disambiguation)
- Crossroads (disambiguation)
