= Crossroads Mall =

Crossroads Mall may refer to:

In United States of America:

- Crossroads Center (St. Cloud, Minnesota), a shopping mall in St. Cloud, Minnesota
- Crossroads Mall (Waterloo, Iowa), a former shopping mall in Waterloo, Iowa
- Crossroads Mall (Colorado), former shopping mall in Boulder, Colorado
- Crossroads Mall (Florida), a former shopping mall in the Tampa-St. Petersburg, Florida Bay Area
- The Crossroads (Portage, Michigan), a shopping mall in Portage (Kalamazoo), Michigan
- Crossroads Mall (Omaha), a former shopping mall in Omaha, Nebraska
- Crossroads Mall (Oklahoma), a former shopping mall in Oklahoma City, Oklahoma
- Crossroads Mall (Virginia), a small shopping mall in Airport, Roanoke, Virginia
- Crossroads Plaza (Salt Lake City), a former shopping mall in Salt Lake City, Utah
- Crossroads Shopping Center, a shopping mall in the Crossroads neighborhood of Bellevue, Washington

In India:

- Crossroads Mall (Mumbai), the first shopping mall in Mumbai, India
