= Fork in the road (metaphor) =

Metaphor for making a decision

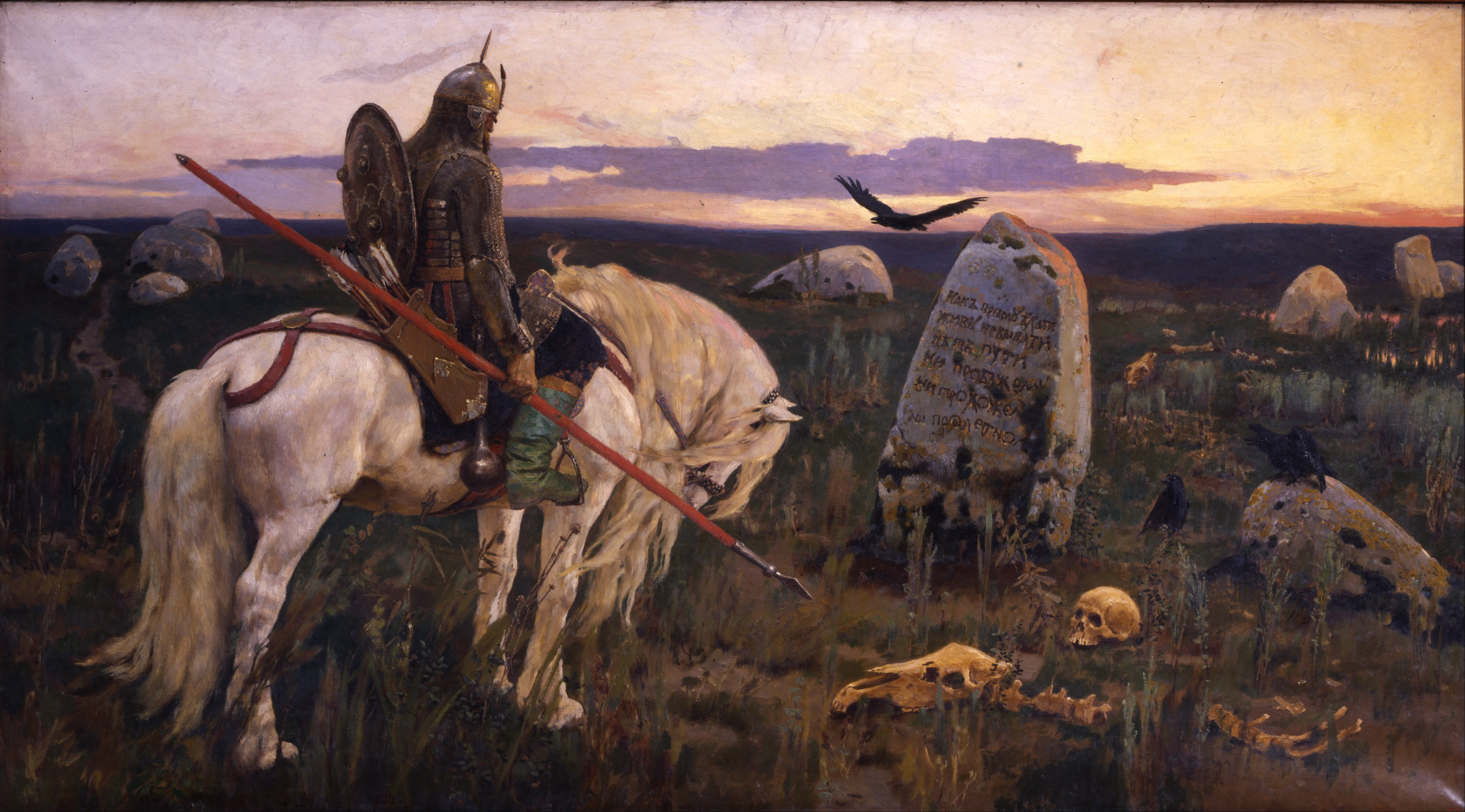
Knight at the Crossroads, Viktor Vasnetsov

A fork in the road is a metaphor, based on a literal expression, for a deciding moment in life or history when a choice between presented options is required, and, once made, the choice cannot be reversed.

== Examples ==
- There is a common motif in Russian folk tales, where a vityaz (Russian knight) comes to a fork in the road and sees a menhir with an inscription that reads: "If you ride to the left, you will lose your horse, if you ride to the right, you will lose your head".
- The phrase appears in the Book of Ezekiel (Ezekiel 21:19–23 NRSV).

"Mortal, mark out two roads for the sword of the king of Babylon to come; both of them shall issue from the same land. And make a signpost, make it for a fork in the road leading to a city; mark out the road for the sword to come to Rabbah of the Ammonites or to Judah and to Jerusalem the fortified.

- A fork in the road is mused upon by Robert Frost in his poem "The Road Not Taken", which begins, "Two roads diverged in a yellow wood..."
- Malapropist extraordinaire Yogi Berra's saying "When you come to a fork in the road, take it" made the title of his book When You Come to a Fork in the Road, Take It!: Inspiration and Wisdom From One of Baseball's Greatest Heroes.
- It is also depicted in the book Alice's Adventures in Wonderland where Alice came to a fork in the road and saw a Cheshire cat in the tree.
- The album cover of A Nice Pair includes a literal depiction of a fork in the road, a visual pun on the expression.
- During the inauguration of Donald J Trump as the 47th President of the United States of America on January 20, 2025, Elon Musk said in his controversial speech "This was a fork in the road in human civilization." On January 28, the Office of Personnel Management sent an email titled "Fork in the Road" to over 2 million federal employees that essentially offered them 8 months salary if they would quit. The email was similar to an identically titled email that Musk sent to all Twitter employees when he took over the company.

== See also ==
- Crossroads (culture)
- Fork in the road (disambiguation) (for other meanings of Fork in the road)
- Road junction
- Point of no return
