= Forks of the Road =

Forks of the Road may refer to:

- Altaville, California
- Moravian Falls, North Carolina
- Forks of the Road slave market

== See also ==
- Road Forks, New Mexico
- Fork in the road, a disambiguation page
