= 2025 United States federal mass layoffs =

About 300,000 United States federal civil service layoffs have been announced by the second Trump administration, almost all of them attributed to the Department of Government Efficiency. On August 26, 2025, the Partnership for Public Service said just under 200,000 federal workers had already left their jobs. As of July 14, 2025, CNN has tracked at least 51,224 workers laid off or targeted for layoffs. As of May 12, 2025, The New York Times tracked more than 58,500 confirmed cuts, more than 76,000 employee buyouts, and more than 149,000 other planned reductions; cuts total 12% of the 2.4 million civilian federal workers. By March 2026, 9% of the federal workforce has been eliminated.

Comparison of changes in federal civilian employment starting from the December before each president began his term. Data through June 2025.

The federal workforce has been reduced in stages: an executive order deprived civil servants of employment protections; a program nudged workers to resign; agencies were shut down; and a series of reductions in force (RIF) were planned. Critics argue the layoffs reduced critical services, violated the law, increased the power of the presidency, and stemmed from "deep state" conspiracy theories. The White House has claimed that they saved expenditures, reduced regulations, and downsized the government role in society. It has at times rescinded layoff notifications. Federal judges have ruled many of the firings to be illegal, but refused to reinstate workers citing recent Supreme Court's rulings in favor of the administration's claims of expansive executive authority.

Responses to the mass layoffs have included praise, criticism, and lawsuits.

== Background ==
=== Project 2025 ===
We want the bureaucrats to be traumatically affected. When they wake up in the morning, we want them to not want to go to work because they are increasingly viewed as the villains. We want their funding to be shut down so that the EPA can't do all of the rules against our energy industry because they have no bandwidth financially to do so. We want to put them in trauma.

— Future and former Trump OMB Director Russell Vought explains his plans for the federal workforce in 2023.

In 2023, Project 2025 laid out policies to shrink agencies, increase presidential power, and replace civil servants with loyalists. Already at the end of his first term, nominated Russ Vought was Acting administrator of the Office of Management and Budget (OMB). During his campaign, Donald Trump promised to nominate Vought for the same role, and Congress approved him on February 6.

Vought has also been described as one of Project 2025's architects. In Chapter 2 of the manifesto, Vought writes that the OMB director's role is to "bring the bureaucracy in line with all budgetary, regulatory, and management decisions", a task he would not fulfill if "he lacks knowledge of what the agencies are doing", and so must acquire "sufficient visibility into the deep caverns of agency decision-making".

For Rep. John Rose (R-TN), only Project 2025 explains the flow of executive orders. CNN analyzed the first 53 and found that 36 followed it; Paul Dans, who was OPM's Chief of staff during the first Trump administration and oversaw Project 2025 at the Heritage Foundation, said that it was "exactly the work [Project 2025] set out to do." Politico outlined 37 cases where the orders align with it, some nearly verbatim.

=== DOGE ===
During his campaign for a second term, Trump inveighed against "bureaucrats" who were "destroying this country", saying they were "crooked" and "don't work at all". He promoted conspiracy theories that a "deep state" was actively working against him and America, and promised to remove them when in power.

After winning the 2024 presidential election, he tapped Elon Musk, the largest single donor to his campaign, to lead a new initiative, dubbed the Department of Government Efficiency (DOGE), to carry out mass layoffs and other measures. Musk has pushed for automation and privatization. Musk celebrated the terminations on social media.

About 300,000 layoffs have been announced by the second Trump administration, almost all of them attributed to DOGE.

== Implementation ==
The shrinking of the federal workforce has taken place in several overlapping stages.

=== Schedule F ===
On January 28, 2025, Trump issued an executive order to strip legal protections "from political firings" for thousands of federal employees.

=== Deferred resignation program ===
Also on January 28, the administration offered a "deferred-resignation" deal that, by mid-February, about 75,000 federal workers accepted.

=== Firings of probationary employees ===
On February 13, Charles Ezell, acting director of the U.S. Office of Personnel Management, signed a directive instructing federal agencies to dismiss probationary employees—generally, federal workers who have held their jobs less than a year, or had been promoted into the excepted service during that time. Ezell told agencies to tell the fired employees that their performance was inadequate, and that they needed to cite no evidence.

Depending on the agency, employees were given notices that read that either the agency "no longer has a need for your services," or it had "determined that you have failed to demonstrate fitness or qualifications for continued employment because your subject matter knowledge, skills and abilities do not meet the department's current needs." Another variant read "unfortunately, the agency finds that you are not fit for continued employment because your ability, knowledge and skills do not fit the Agency's current needs, and your performance has not been adequate to justify further employment at the Agency." Even though a cause was alleged poor performance, some employees had either received the maximum possible rating or had not had their performance reviewed. Others had received "stellar performance evaluations" the previous year.

=== Reductions in force ===
On February 13, OMB Director Vought and OPM Acting Director Ezell ordered federal agencies to send them plans by March 13 to slash their workforces through layoffs. They said the agencies "should focus on employees whose jobs are not required in statute and who face furloughs in government shutdowns—typically around one-third of the federal workforce, or 700,000 employees." In May, a federal judge issued a preliminary injunction, temporarily pausing the RIF actions across major agencies, calling into question the legal authority of executive-implemented RIF orders.

In July, Noah Peters argued in court that RIF plans should not be made public.

=== Rescissions ===
Following the administration's contract rescission orders, more than 1 million federal workers lost their bargaining rights. ‌ In some cases, the Trump administration subsequently realized that it had laid off people in critical positions and needed to reinstate them, as with Department of Agriculture employees engaged in efforts to combat the spread of the H5N1 bird flu virus and National Nuclear Security Administration employees. Since former federal employees no longer had access to their government email accounts, supervisors were sometimes uncertain how to contact them. The Food and Drug Administration rehired some staff responsible for reviewing medical devices and food safely. Hours after laying off 950 Indian Health Service employees on February 14, Robert F. Kennedy Jr., Secretary of Health and Human Services, reinstated them.

=== Litigation ===
Legal analysts described such firings as setting up Supreme Court cases that could expand his power over independent executive branch agencies that Congress set up to be insulated from presidential control based on a maximalist interpretation of the unitary executive theory. His actions were described by legal experts as unprecedented or in violation of federal law, and with the intent of replacing employees with workers more aligned with his agenda. Trump criticized and fired officials who reported facts, statistics, and analysis that went against his opinions, and ordered them removed or redone to suit his preferences. In a peer-reviewed journal article, Donald Moynihan described the mass firings as an anti-statist restructuring of American government centered around political loyalty.

Lower courts froze the firings. However, on July 8, 2025, the Supreme Court overrode those orders, thereby allowing the workforce reductions to continue. Politico described the cuts as the largest attempt to reorganize the federal government since the professionalization of the civil service. It described the court's order as marking "a major reversal in the pre-Trump conventional wisdom that federal workers enjoyed significant job protections" and that it would "allow Trump and future presidents going forward to use the threat of layoffs to pressure federal workers to carry out political appointees' orders, or to root out dissenters". The layoffs led to large departures of subject-matter experts resulting in the loss of institutional knowledge and technical expertise from the federal government.

OPM does not have any authority whatsoever under any statute in the history of the universe to hire and fire employees within another agency.

— William Alsup, 2025

On September 12, federal judge William Alsup ruled that OPM illegally directed the firings of probationary workers, but refused to order reinstatement, noting that "the Supreme Court has made clear enough by way of its emergency docket that it will overrule judicially granted relief respecting hirings and firings within the executive, not just in this case but in others". On September 24, federal judge Ana C. Reyes ruled that the administration unlawfully fired 17 inspectors general, but refused to reinstate them noting that Trump would simply re-fire them after providing a congressionally-mandated 30 days notice. The Supreme Court stayed the reinstatement of several Democratic members of federal agencies after their terminations were found to be illegal by federal judges, and signaled openness to overturning the 1935 case Humphrey's Executor v. United States which prevented at-will firings at independent agencies to insulate them from political pressure.

During the 2025 United States federal government shutdown, the Trump administration announced a new wave of 4,100 RIFs, triggering multiple lawsuits. Judge Susan Illston temporarily blocked the firings, citing public statements by Vought and Trump that she said showed explicit political motives, such as Trump saying the cuts would only target "Democrat agencies". By October 25, Politico described the layoffs as chaotic and reminiscent of DOGE, with hundreds employees being fired in error and several agencies pushing back on the amount of cuts sought by Vought.

== Agencies ==
=== Targets ===
DOGE took control of the federal government information systems in order to downsize federal agencies. DOGE embedded units from the executive branch of the government, including cabinet departments and various types of independent agencies. It targeted regulatory agencies and units from the legislative branch. It also targeted quasi-autonomous non-governmental organizations and organizations outside the federal government.

=== Losses ===
Unit	Acronym	Type	Number	Size
18F		GSA agency	90	100%
AmeriCorps	CNCS	Independent agency	650	84%
Bonneville Power Administration	BPA	DOE agency	400	
Bureau of Consular Affairs	CA	DOS agency	102	
Bureau of Indian Education	BIE	DOI agency	85	
Bureau of Land Management	BLM	DOI agency	800	
Centers for Disease Control and Prevention	CDC	HHS agency	1,622	13%
Consumer Financial Protection Bureau	CFPB	Fed agency	1,500	86%
Central Intelligence Agency	CIA	EOP agency	50	
Citizenship and Immigration Services	CIS	DHS agency	50	
Cybersecurity and Infrastructure Security Agency	CISA	DHS agency	130	
Department of Agriculture	USDA	Department	21,000	
Department of Commerce	DOC	Department	500	
Department of Defense	DOD	Department	55,000	
Department of Education	ED	Department	1,378	33%
Department of Energy	DoE	Department	4,970	
Department of Interior	DOI	Department	9,700	
Department of Justice	DOJ	Department	12	
Department of State	DOS	Department	1,353	9%
Department of Transportation	DOT	Department	4,915	
Environmental Protection Agency	EPA	Independent agency	388	
Federal Aviation Administration	FAA	DOT agency	400	
Food and Drug Administration	FDA	HHS agency	3,500	17%
Federal Deposit Insurance Corporation	FDIC	Independent agency	1,200	19%
Federal Emergency Management Agency	FEMA	DHS agency	200	
General Services Administration	GSA	Independent agency	1,000	9%
Health and Human Services	HHS	Independent agency	13,450	
Housing and Urban Development	HUD	Department	4,000	
Institute of Museum and Library Services	IMLS	Independent agency	75	100%
Internal Revenue Service	IRS	USDT agency	30,000	
National Aeronautics and Space Administration	NASA	Independent agency	4,890	
National Institutes of Health	NIH	HHS agency	1,200	
National Nuclear Security Administration	NNSA	DoE agency	50–300	
National Oceanic and Atmospheric Administration	NOAA	DOC agency	800	
National Park Service	NPS	DOI agency	1,000	
Natural Resources Conservation Service	NRCS	USDA agency	1,200	
Office of Community Planning and Development		HUD agency	780	83%
Office of Personnel Management	OPM	Independent agency	70	
Small Business Administration	SBA	Independent agency	2,700	42%
Social Security Administration	SSA	Independent agency	41	
Transportation Security Administration	TSA	DHS agency	200	
United States Agency for Global Media	USAGM	Independent agency	1,400	85%
US Agency for International Development	USAID	DOS agency	10,000	
US Digital Service	USDS	EOP agency	50	
US Forest Service	USFS	USDA agency	3,475	9%
US Geological Survey	USGS	DOI agency	1,000	10%
US Postal Service	USPS	Independent agency	10,500	
Veterans Affairs	VA	Department	12,700	
Voice of America	VOA	USAGM agency	20	100%

== Impact ==
=== Workers rights ===
Politico stated that no previous president since the professionalization of the civil service to protect it from political interference has attempted such a large scale reorganization of the federal government. Following the Supreme Court's 8-1 decision that the plaintiffs' attempt to halt such reorganizations without Congressional approval were likely to fail, Politico stated it marked "a major reversal in the pre-Trump conventional wisdom that federal workers enjoyed significant job protections" and that it would "allow Trump and presidents going forward to use the threat of layoffs to pressure federal workers to carry out political appointees' orders, or to root out dissenters".

=== Demography ===
As part of Trump's efforts to root out "DEI" initiatives in the federal government, agencies with the highest planned workforce reductions and dismissals were also those with the highest percentages of women, minority, and Black employees. By June 2025, more than 300,000 Black women left the labor force. Christian E. Weller, senior fellow at American Progress and professor of public policy at the McCormack Graduate School of Policy and Global Studies at the University of Massachusetts, stated the job cuts will disproportionally harm African Americans in the federal government. Over the same period, there were job increases of 142,000 for White women, 176,000 for Hispanic women, and 365,000 for White men.

Trump's firings of senior military officers were disproportionately women, and others sometimes came after conservative organizations targeted specific individuals for criticism. Far-right activist Laura Loomer emerged as what Politico described as a "blunt enforcer of allegiance to Trump", with her operating a "tip line" for staffers to report colleagues for alleged disloyalty. It further described widespread loyalty purges and an atmosphere of "paranoia" within the executive branch, and that it was in line with the ethos of personnel director Sergio Gor and the approach of the Department of Government Efficiency.

=== Privatization ===
The Brookings Institution described the firings as setting the stage for greater privatization and automation of the federal government, and Trump appointees had multiple conflicts of interest and financial ties to companies that would benefit as part of an effort to privatize government functions. Particularly, companies were chosen to assist the National Oceanic and Atmospheric Administration that had ties to Trump officials who were chosen in leadership positions at NOAA who both advocated for and stood to benefit financially from the privatization of weather forecasting.

=== Expertise ===
The mass layoffs were described as a culmination of Trump and his allies' belief in a "deep state" within the scientific and federal bureaucracy of the United States. The layoffs led to large departures of experts resulting in the loss of institutional knowledge and technical expertise from the federal government. According to The New York Times, "state and local governments have been actively recruiting federal workers impacted by the Trump administration's effort to dramatically reduce the federal work force."

=== Geography ===
The cuts were particularly felt in federal agency’s hubs, such as the Kansas City metropolitan area.

=== Psychological effects ===
Harvard Business School professor Amy Edmondson said that the layoffs would also affect remaining workers: "The impact is intimidation and fear". On May 20, 2025, The Washington Post reported that several dozen interviewed by the paper were suffering from panic attacks, depression, and suicidal thoughts.

=== Risks ===
On June 1, Reuters reported that the mass firings had threatened safety training for dangerous jobs, with the National Institute for Occupational Safety and Health particularly affected.

The CDC cyclosporiasis lab was heavily downsized during the mass layoffs, impacting testing capabilities during a 2026 outbreak.

== See also ==
- 2025 dismissals of inspectors general
- 2025 U.S. Department of Justice resignations
- 2025 US federal deferred resignation program
- Civil service independence
- Executive aggrandizement
- NOAA under the second presidency of Donald Trump
