= Lawsuits involving the Department of Government Efficiency =

The actions of the Department of Government Efficiency (DOGE), informally headed by Elon Musk, are the subject of ongoing lawsuits. Legal experts have described many of DOGE's actions as illegal, breaking multiple privacy, security, and congressional laws and regulations. It has been described as taking a "move fast and break things" approach. Legal analysts have alleged breaches of law regarding aspects of the Privacy Act, Internal Revenue Code, and Federal Information Security Modernization Act. Forcing workers out of their offices and claims of "deleting" agencies and seizure of funds authorized by Congress have been described as breaking Article 1 of the United States Constitution and constituting a potential "constitutional crisis".

Legal proceedings have been complicated by difficulties in establishing basic facts, such as Musk's role, the identities and formal powers of his associates, and the unclear relationship among Musk, DOGE, and political appointees backed by Musk. There have also been questions about how many of Musk's associates have been detailed to specific agencies, whether they act as employees of those agencies or of the White House, and what formal powers they have to demand access to agency computer systems.

On February 5, Republican members of the United States House Committee on Oversight and Government Reform blocked an effort by committee Democrats to subpoena Musk. The White House and the Republican Party have defended DOGE, Musk, Trump, and other plaintiffs, stating they are in full compliance with federal law. In February 2026, Judge Theodore D. Chuang ruled that Musk could be deposed about what he and DOGE did with USAID. The Trump administration petitioned the Fourth Circuit for a writ of mandamus, and on March 4, 2026, a divided panel granted it 2–1, directing the district court to issue a protective order barring the depositions of Musk and former officials Peter Marocco and Jeremy Lewin. The majority held that the lower court had abused its discretion, as the plaintiffs had not first sought the information through other means.

== Disclosure of personal and financial records ==
Multiple lawsuits accuse DOGE and Musk of having broken the Privacy Act of 1974. DOGE has given conflicting testimonies on the data it has accessed, the identity of the DOGE members who have accessed it, and the reasons why they did.

=== Access to government computer systems ===
On February 5, several labors unions—the American Federation of Labor and Congress of Industrial Organizations (AFL-CIO), the American Federation of Government Employees, the American Federation of State, County, and Municipal Employees, the Service Employees International Union, and Communication Workers of America—along with the Economic Policy Institute filed a lawsuit to prevent DOGE from accessing computer systems at the Department of Labor (DOL), subsequently amending the suit to also include systems at the Department of Health and Human Services (HHS), and the Consumer Financial Protection Bureau (CFPB). They asked for a temporary restraining order, which was denied on February 7. On February 27, the judge, John Bates, ordered the Trump administration to make four witnesses available for depositions, one each from DOGE and the three federal departments.

On February 4, three federal employee unions—the Alliance for Retired Americans, the AFGE, and the Service Employees International Union (SEIU)—filed a lawsuit against the Treasury Department, (Note: Alliance for Retired Americans v. Bessent, No. 1:25-cv-00313 (D.D.C. February 3, 2025)) alleging that Treasury Secretary Scott Bessent unlawfully granted DOGE access to sensitive data. The White House defended Musk's role, stating he had followed all federal laws. On February 6, Judge Colleen Kollar-Kotelly agreed to a proposal filed by the Justice Department to temporarily limit DOGE to "read-only" access of Treasury data until a hearing for a preliminary injunction could be held on February 24. Department of Justice lawyers struggled to explain how DOGE plans to use sensitive taxpayer data. In the hearing, Kollar-Kotelly said that she had "concerns about the constitutionality of U.S.D.S.'s structure and operations". She also questioned the government's lawyer about who the DOGE administrator is and what Musk's specific role is in DOGE, but the lawyer said that he didn't know.

On February 7, the University of California Student Association filed a lawsuit (Note: Univ. of California Student Ass'n v. Carter, No. 1:25-cv-00354 (D.D.C. February 7, 2025)) against acting secretary of education Denise Carter and the Department of Education (ED) in the District of Columbia, claiming an "enormous and unprecedented" "intrusion into individuals' privacy". The case has been assigned to Judge Randolph D. Moss.

On February 7, the ACLU filed Freedom of Information Act requests with over 40 federal agencies "for any records that reveal whether DOGE or its representatives have sought or obtained access to databases containing personally identifiable information, financial records, healthcare data, or other sensitive government-held records of Americans".

On February 11, the Electronic Frontier Foundation (EFF) filed its own lawsuit (Note: Am. Fed'n of Gov't Employees v. U.S. Off. of Personnel Mgmt., No. 1:25-cv-01237 (S.D.N.Y. February 11, 2025)) to prevent DOGE from accessing the Office of Personnel Management's data.

- Alliance for Retired Americans v. Bessent (D.D.C.), 1:25-cv-00313
- American Civil Liberties Union v. Social Security Administration (D.D.C.), 1:25-cv-01217
- American Federation of Government Employees v. Office of Personnel Management (S.D.N.Y), 1:25-cv-01237
- American Federation of Labor and Congress of Industrial Organizations v. Department of Labor (D.D.C.), 1:25-cv-00339
- American Federation of State, County and Municipal Employees, AFL-CIO v. Social Security Administration (D. Md.) 1:25-cv-00596, appealed to the 4th Cir., 25-1411, appealed to the Supreme Court, Social Security Administration v. American Federation of State, County and Municipal Employees, 24A1063
- American Federation of Teachers v. Bessent (D. Md.), 8:25-cv-00430, appealed to the Fourth Circuit, 25-1282
- Center for Taxpayer Rights v. Internal Revenue Service (D.D.C), 1:25-cv-00457
- Electronic Privacy Information Center v. U.S. Office of Personnel Management (E.D.V.A.) 1:25-cv-00255
- Morris v. Trump (D. Md.), 1:25-cv-00435
- National Treasury Employees Union v. Vought (D.D.C.), 1:25-cv-00380
- Nemeth-Greenleaf v. U.S. Office of Personnel Management (D.D.C.), 1:25-cv-00407
- State of New York v. Donald J. Trump (S.D.N.Y.), 1:25-cv-01144, appealed to the 2nd Cir., 25-1860
- University of California Student Association v. Carter (D.D.C.), 1:25-cv-00354 (plaintiffs dismissed the action)

=== Compensation for access to data ===
On February 12, a class action suit (Note: Gribbon v. Musk, No. 1:25-cv-00422 (D.D.C. February 12, 2025)) was filed against Musk, Office of Personnel Management, Department of the Treasury and Secretary of Treasury Scott Bessent. Gribbon v. Musk claims that taxpayers, federal employees and those receiving benefits should be compensated for DOGE's access to their personal and financial data. It has been assigned to judge Christopher R. Cooper.

- Gribbon v. Musk (D.D.C.), 1:25-cv-00422 (voluntary dismissal)

=== Federal deferred resignation program ("Fork in the Road" memo) ===
A lawsuit, filed (Note: Jane Does 1–2 v. Office of Personnel Management, No. 1:25-cv-00234 (D.D.C. January 27, 2025)) on January 27 in the District Court for the District of Columbia by two federal employees against the Office of Personnel Management (OPM), alleges that it failed to conduct a federally mandated assessment to evaluate and mitigate privacy risks associated with the alleged new email system's data collection on federal employees. On February 3, four unions representing 800,000 federal employees filed suit (Note: New York et al. v. Scott Bessent et al., No. 25-313 (D.D.C. February 3, 2025)) against the Treasury Department, arguing that OPM violated the Administrative Procedure Act by failing to provide a legal basis for the buyout offer. On February 6, Judge George O'Toole Jr. temporarily blocked Trump and DOGE from engaging in any further action related to the buyout until further arguments were heard. On February 12, Judge O'Toole ruled that the plaintiffs lacked standing to challenge the buyout offer because they were not directly affected.

- Jane Does 1-2 v. Office of Personnel Management (D.D.C.), 1:25-cv-00234
- American Federation of Government Employees, AFL-CIO v. Ezell (D. Mass), 1:25-cv-10276

== Dismantling of agencies ==
=== AmeriCorps ===
- State of Maryland v. Corporation for National and Community Service (D. Md.), 1:25-cv-01363
- Elev8 Baltimore, Inc. v. Corporation for National and Community Service (D. Md.), 1:25-cv-01458
- Erie County New York v. Corporation for National and Community Service (D.D.C.), 1:25-cv-00783 (voluntary dismissal)

=== National Endowment for the Humanities ===
- American Council of Learned Societies v. McDonald (S.D.N.Y.), 1:25-cv-03657
- The Authors Guild v. National Endowment for the Humanities (S.D.N.Y.), 1:25-cv-03923 (case consolidated with American Council of Learned Societies v. McDonald)

When DOGE cancelled 1,400 previously approved grants by the National Endowment for the Humanities, the Authors Guild and the American Council of Learned Societies sued in the Southern District of New York. The lawsuit revealed that DOGE employees Nate Cavanaugh and Justin Fox used ChatGPT to decide which grants should be cut because of their association with diversion, equity and inclusion. Judge Colleen McMahon ruled Fox and Cavanaugh's efforts to be violations of the First and Fifth amendments, describing them as “a textbook example of unconstitutional viewpoint discrimination” and ordered the restoration of the grants.

=== U.S. African Development Foundation ===
- Brehm v. Marocco (D.D.C.), 1:25-cv-00660

=== US Agency for International Development (USAID) firings and shutdown ===
On February 6, a lawsuit (Note: American Foreign Service Ass'n v. Trump, No. 1:25-cv-00352 (D.D.C. February 6, 2025)) seeking to halt the shutdown of USAID was filed in the United States District Court for the District of Columbia by the American Foreign Service Association and the AFGE. The judge, Carl J. Nichols, issued a temporary restraining order on February 7 against imminent plans for 2,200 employees to be placed on administrative leave and for overseas USAID workers to return to the US. After a hearing, Judge Nichols extended the freeze through February 21.

Nichols held a telephone hearing on February 19. After Trump-appointed USAID leader Peter Marocco initially told the court that overseas USAID employees would be given a choice as to whether remain abroad while on administrative leave, but days later told the court otherwise, Nichols called the government's contradictions "a mess" and ordered the DOJ to clarify its stance by February 20.

- American Federation of Government Employees v. Trump (D.D.C.), 1:25-cv-00352
- AIDS Vaccine Advocacy Coalition v. U.S. Department of State (D.D.C.), 1:25-cv-00400, appealed to the D.C. Cir., 25-5046 and 25-5098, appealed to the Supreme Court, Department of State v. AIDS Vaccine Advocacy Coalition, 24A831
- Global Health Council v. Trump (D.D.C.), 1:25-cv-00402
- Personal Services Contractor Association v. Trump (D.D.C.), 1:25-cv-00469

== Dismantling of independent organizations ==
=== US Institute of Peace ===
- Pippenger v. U.S. DOGE Service (D.D.C.), 1:25-cv-01090
- U.S. Institute of Peace v. Jackson (D.D.C.), 1:25-cv-00804

== Establishment of DOGE ==
With the signing of Executive Order 14158, Trump renamed the U.S. Digital Service (USDS) the U.S. DOGE Service (also USDS), and established the U.S. DOGE Service Temporary Organization, both under the authority of an administrator. Trump referred to Elon Musk as being in charge of DOGE. Amy Gleason was later identified as the acting administrator.

=== Appointments clause lawsuits ===
A lawsuit by 26 USAID employees and contractors claims Elon Musk’s role as DOGE head violates the Appointments Clause, alleging he wields significant government authority without Senate confirmation.

On February 13, fourteen state attorneys general filed suit (Note: New Mexico v. Musk, No. 25-cv-429 (D.D.C. February 13, 2025)) against Musk, DOGE, and Trump in the District of Columbia, arguing that although Musk had been designated a special government employee, he was acting as a principal officer of the United States, and that the Appointments Clause required him to be confirmed by the Senate. They requested a temporary restraining order preventing Musk and DOGE from firing employees or accessing information from multiple federal agencies. In its response, the Trump administration argued that Musk was a senior advisor to the president and had no formal authority. On February 18, Judge Tanya Chutkan denied the request for the temporary restraining order, though she wrote that the states "legitimately call into question what appears to be the unchecked authority of an unelected individual and an entity that was not created by Congress and over which it has no oversight."

- Does 1-26 v. Musk (D. Md.), 8:25-cv-00462-TDC, appealed to the 4th Cir., 25-1273
- Japanese American Citizens League v. Musk (D.D.C), 1:25-cv-00643 (consolidated with State of New Mexico v. Musk (D.D.C.), 1.25-cv-00429)
- State of New Mexico. v. Musk (D.D.C.), 1.25-cv-00429, petitioned the court of appeals for the District of Columbia circuit (D. Cir.), In re: Elon Musk, 25-5072

=== Federal Advisory Committee Act (FACA) lawsuits ===
On January 20, the day of Trump's inauguration, The Washington Post learned of a pending lawsuit to be launched against DOGE minutes after Trump was to be sworn in, questioning whether DOGE is a presidential advisory commission obeying federal transparency rules about certain practices, such as disclosure and hiring. The same day, three more lawsuits were filed against Trump, DOGE, and the Office of Management and Budget (OMB), alleging violation of the Federal Advisory Committee Act (FACA), which requires that "the advisory committee have a fair balance in viewpoints represented, that they do not meet in secret, and that their records and work product be made available for public inspection". All four lawsuits were filed in the District of Columbia.

The first suit (Note: Public Citizen v. Trump, No. 25-cv-164 (D.D.C. January 20, 2025)) was filed by Public Citizen, State Democracy Defenders Fund, and the American Federation of Government Employees (AFGE) against Trump and the OMB. The Center for Biological Diversity next filed suit against the OMB. (Note: Center for Biological Diversity v. Office of Management and Budget, No. 25-165 (D.D.C. January 20, 2025)) National Security Counselors sued DOGE, OMB, Office of Personnel Management, and multiple Trump administration officials, (Note: Lentini v. Dept. of Government Efficiency, No. 1:25-cv-00166 (D.D.C. January 20, 2025)) while a coalition of non-government organizations filed suit against OMB and DOGE. (Note: Amer. Public Health Ass'n v. Office of Management and Budget, No. 25-cv-167 (D.D.C. January 20, 2025))

Public Citizen, Lentini, and American Public Health Association were all assigned to Judge Jia M. Cobb; the government filed a motion to consolidate the cases on February 4, 2025, and they were consolidated on February 18. Public Citizen dismissed its case without prejudice, but the other two cases continue. Center for Biological Diversity v. U.S. Department of the Interior has been assigned to Judge Beryl A. Howell.

- American Public Health Association v. Office of Management and Budget (D.D.C.), 1:25-cv-00167 (consolidated with case no. 1:25-cv-00164, Public Citizen v. Trump)
- Center for Biological Diversity v. U.S. Department of Interior (D.D.C.), 1:25-cv-00612
- Lentini v. Department of Government Efficiency (D.D.C), 1:25-cv-00166 (consolidated with case no. 1:25-cv-00164, Public Citizen v. Trump)
- Public Citizen, Inc. v. Trump (D.D.C.), 1:25-cv-00164 (case consolidated with Lentini v. DOGE and American Public Health Association v. OMB; Public Citizen dismissed its case without prejudice, but the other two cases continue)

== Freedom of Information Act (FOIA), public records and record-keeping requirements ==
On February 11, watchdog organization American Oversight filed a lawsuit to gain access to all of Musk's communications involving the termination of employees across the federal government. Its lawsuit states that DOGE is subject to the Freedom of Information Act (FOIA).

On February 19, the nonpartisan watchdog group Project on Government Oversight sued Trump, DOGE, and the DOGE administrator over the claim that DOGE records are subject to the Presidential Records Act, and therefore not subject to public records requests. The lawsuit argues that DOGE is subject to the Federal Records Act since it is acting like a federal agency.

On February 20, watchdog organization Citizens for Responsibility and Ethics in Washington (CREW) sued DOGE to produce documents via the Freedom of Information Act (FOIA). On March 10, the presiding judge, Christopher R. Cooper, ordered DOGE to produce the documents for CREW, finding that DOGE's "secrecy" and "rapid pace" warranted "quick release of information about its structure and activities". While making his ruling, Cooper concluded that "the authority exercised by [DOGE] across the federal government and the dramatic cuts it has apparently made with no congressional input appear to be unprecedented". Cooper found that DOGE "obtained unprecedented access to sensitive personal and classified data and payment systems across federal agencies" and "appears to have the power not just to evaluate federal programs, but to drastically reshape and even eliminate them wholesale". In mid-April, Cooper ordered additional discovery and ruled that Amy Gleason, DOGE's acting administrator, would have to sit for a deposition. The Department of Justice (DOJ) then petitioned the Court of Appeals for the District of Columbia Circuit for a writ of mandamus to prevent the deposition. The appeals court stayed Cooper's ruling while it considered the petition, but on May 14, it rejected the petition. On May 21, the DOJ appealed to the Supreme Court, asking it to stay Cooper's order and claiming that it was inappropriate to allow discovery before the court had determined whether DOGE was subject to FOIA.

- American Oversight v. U.S. Department of Government Efficiency (D.D.C.), 1:25-cv-00409
- Center for Biological Diversity v. Office of Management and Budget (D.D.C.), 1:25-cv-00165
- Citizens For Responsibility And Ethics In Washington v. Consumer Financial Protection Bureau (D.D.C.), 1:25-cv-01768
- Citizens for Responsibility and Ethics in Washington v. U.S. DOGE Service (D.D.C.), 1:25-cv-00511, petition for a writ of mandamus (D.C. Cir.), In re: U.S. DOGE Service, 25-5130, appealed to the Supreme Court as U.S. DOGE Service v. Citizens for Responsibility and Ethics in Washington, 24A1122
- Democracy Forward Foundation v. U.S. Department of the Treasury (D.D.C.), 1:25-cv-00684
- Democracy Forward Foundation v. U.S. Marshals Service (D.D.C.), 1:25-cv-00749
- The Intercept v. U.S. Department of Government Efficiency (S.D.N.Y.), 1:25-cv-02404
- Project on Government Oversight, Inc. v. Trump (D.D.C.), 1:25-cv-00527

== Large-scale reductions in force ==
=== Class action lawsuits ===
Thousands of federal employees have joined class action suits challenging the layoffs.

On February 21, the Office of Special Counsel, an independent agency that investigates federal workers' complaints, decided that, in a case involving six probationary government workers at six different agencies, the workers had been illegally fired. The decision was revealed on February 24.

- American Association of People With Disabilities v. Dudek (D.D.C.), 1:25-cv-00977
- American Federation Of Government Employees, AFL-CIO v. Office of Personnel Management and Ezell (N.D. Cal.), 3:25-cv-01780, appealed to the Ninth Circuit, 25-1677, and Office of Personnel Management v. American Federation of Government Employees (Supreme Court), 24A904
- American Federation of Government Employees, AFL-CIO v. Trump (N.D. Cal.) 3:25-cv-03698, appealed to the 9th Cir., 25-3030
- American Library Association v. Sonderling, 1:25-cv-01050
- Jackson v. Kennedy (D.D.C.), 1:25-cv-01750
- National Treasury Employees Union v. Donald J. Trump (D.D.C.), 1:25-cv-00420 (voluntarily dismissed)
- Pueblo of Isleta v. Secretary of the Department of the Interior (D.D.C.), 1:25-cv-00696
- State of Maryland v. U.S. Department of Agriculture (D. Md.), 1:25-cv-00748, appealed to the Fourth Circuit, 25-1248

== Pauses and terminations of federal funds ==
=== Denial of grants ===
- Child Trends, Incorporated v. United States Department of Education (D. Md.), 8:25-cv-01154
- Massachusetts Fair Housing Center v. Department of Housing and Urban Development (D. Mass), 3:25-cv-30041
- American Council of Learned Societies v. McDonald (S.D. New York), 1:25-cv-03657 Merged with Authors Guild v. National Endowment for the Humanities (S.D.N.Y), 1:25-cv-03923

=== Impoundment of allocated funds ===
- Sustainability Institute v. Trump (D.S.C.), 2:25-cv-02152

=== Treasury payments ===
==== District of Rhode Island ====
On January 28, twenty-two state attorneys general filed suit (Note: New York et al. v. Trump et al., No. 1:25-cv-00039 (D.R.I. January 28, 2025)) against Trump and the Treasury Department in the District of Rhode Island for a temporary retraining order (TRO) barring Trump from pausing any further federal aid. On January 31, Judge John J. McConnell Jr., granted the TRO, effectively blocking Trump's federal aid freeze. On February 10, finding that the Trump administration had failed to fully comply with the order, McConnell directed the Trump administration to immediately end any federal funding pause and restore previously frozen funds until a final ruling was made on a permanent injunction to be heard at a later time.

The Trump administration appealed to the U.S. Court of Appeals for the First Circuit. Harrison Fields, a White House spokesman, said that "every action of the Trump-Vance administration is completely lawful". The First Circuit refused to hear the appeal.

Republican US Representative Andrew Clyde (GA-9) announced plans to file articles of impeachment against McConnell, calling him a "partisan activist weaponizing our judicial system to stop President Trump's funding freeze on woke and wasteful government spending".

==== Southern District of New York ====
On February 7, nineteen state attorneys general, largely the same from the Rhode Island federal case, filed suit (Note: New York et al. v. Trump et al., No. 25-CV-1144 (S.D.N.Y. February 7, 2025)) against Trump and the Treasury Department in the Southern District of New York over DOGE's actions within the Bureau of the Fiscal Service (BFS). It was initially assigned to Judge Paul A. Engelmayer for an emergency ruling, and early the next morning, he issued a preliminary injunction barring DOGE members from accessing Treasury data and ordering all existing unauthorized copies to be deleted immediately.

The White House called the ruling "absurd and judicial overreach" and referred to Engelmayer as an "activist". Musk posted similar sentiments on X and claimed Engelmayer was protecting scammers. Conservative activist Charlie Kirk encouraged the Trump administration to defy the order should it become permanent. That weekend, JD Vance posted on X that "judges aren't allowed to control the executive's legitimate power". Arkansas senator Tom Cotton called Engelmayer an "outlaw".

The case was taken on by the judge assigned to the case, Jeannette Vargas, who on February 11 adjusted Engelmayer's ruling by allowing Treasury secretary Scott Bessent and other senior department leaders whose roles required Senate confirmation to access Treasury data. A hearing was held before Vargas on February 14; she extended the injunction and said she would rule shortly on whether it would remain in place throughout the proceedings. The case is expected to last months.

On April 11 the judge allowed one DOGE staffer access, and on May 27 allowed four more DOGE staffers and cleared the way for the entire DOGE team to get access.

== Removal of independent agency heads ==
=== Inter-American Foundation ===
- Aviel v. Gor (D.D.C.), 1:25-cv-00778, appealed to the D.C. Cir., 25-5105

== Requirement for employees to report accomplishments ==
On February 22, the Office of Personnel Management (OPM) sent an email to all federal employees, asking them to respond with "what you accomplished last week" by midnight EST on February 24. Shortly before the email went out, Musk posted about it on X, saying that "Failure to respond will be taken as a resignation." A claim that this action was unlawful was added to a pending lawsuit against the OPM for the mass layoffs of probationary workers. Some agencies instructed their employees not to respond to the email. On February 24, the OPM announced that employees were not required to respond to the email.

== Review of voter registration information ==
- Democratic National Committee v. Trump (D.D.C.), 1:25-cv-00952 (consolidated with League of United Latin American Citizens v. Executive Office of the President)
- League of United Latin American Citizens v. Executive Office of the President (D.D.C.), 1:25-cv-00946
- League of Women Voters Education Fund v. Trump (D.D.C.), 1:25-cv-00955 (consolidated with League of United Latin American Citizens v. Executive Office of the President)

== Case summaries ==
Case	Court	Case no.(s)	First filing date	Outcome	Notes	Ref.
Public Citizen Inc., et al. v. Donald J. Trump and Office of Management and Budget	U.S. District Court for the District of Columbia	1:25-cv-00164	January 20, 2025		Consolidated with case no. 1:25-cv-00167.	
Jerald Lentini, et al. v. Department of Government Efficiency, et al.	U.S. District Court for the District of Columbia	1:25-cv-00166	January 20, 2025		Consolidated with case no. 1:25-cv-00164.	
American Public Health Association, et al. v. Office of Management and Budget, et al.	U.S. District Court for the District of Columbia	1:25-cv-00167	January 20, 2025	Voluntarily dismissal by plaintiffs on May 12, 2025.	Consolidated with case no. 1:25-cv-00164.	
Center for Biological Diversity v. Office of Management and Budget	U.S. District Court for the District of Columbia	1:25-cv-00165	January 20, 2025			
J. Doe 1-26 v. Musk, et al.	U.S. District Court for the District of Maryland	8:25-cv-00462-TDC	February 13, 2025			
New Mexico, et al. v. Musk, et al.	U.S. District Court for the District of Columbia	1.25-cv-00429	February 13, 2025	Action dismissed on May 27, 2025, against President Trump as defendant; but not to others.		
Alliance for Retired Americans, et al. v. Bessent, et al.	U.S. District Court for the District of Columbia	1:25-cv-00313	February 3, 2025			
New York, et al., v. Trump, et al.	U.S. District Court for the Southern District of New York	1:25-cv-01144-JAV	February 7, 2025			
American Federation of Labor and Congress of Industrial Organizations, et al. v. Department of Labor, et al.	U.S. District Court for the District of Columbia	1:25-cv-00339	February 5, 2025			
University of California Student Association v. Carter, et al.	U.S. District Court for the District of Columbia	1:25-cv-00354	February 7, 2025	Voluntary dismissal by plaintiffs on April 16, 2025.		
National Treasury Employees Union v. Vought	U.S. District Court for the District of Columbia	1:25-cv-00380	February 9, 2025			
American Federation of Teachers, et al. v. Bessent, et al.	U.S. District Court for the District of Maryland	8:25-cv-00430	February 10, 2025			
Electronic Privacy Information Center v. U.S. Office of Personnel Management, et al.	U.S. District Court for the Southern District of Virginia	1:25-cv-00255	February 10, 2025			
American Federation of Government Employees, et al. v. Office of Personnel Management et al.	U.S. District Court for the Southern District of New York	1:25-cv-01237	February 11, 2025			
Nemeth-Greenleaf, et al. v. U.S. Office of Personnel Management, et al.	U.S. District Court for the District of Columbia	1:25-cv-00407	February 11, 2025			
Andrea Gribbon, et al. v. Elon Musk, et al.	U.S. District Court for the District of Columbia	1:25-cv-00422	February 12, 2025	Voluntary dismissal by plaintiff on May 15, 2025.		
Center for Taxpayer Rights, et al. v. Internal Revenue Service, et al.	U.S. District Court for the District of Columbia	1:25-cv-00457	February 17, 2025			
American Federation of State, County and Municipal Employees, AFL-CIO, et al. v. Social Security Administration, et al.	U.S. District Court for the District of Maryland	1:25-cv-00596	February 21, 2025	Stay granted by SCOTUS pending appeal in lower court.		
Project on Government Oversight, Inc. v. Donald J. Trump, et al.	U.S. District Court for the District of Columbia	1:25-cv-00527	February 21, 2025	Plaintiff's preliminary injunction denied on June 17, 2025; action stayed on July 21, 2025 pending further order by court.		
Deborah Morris v. Donald Trump, et al.	U.S. District Court for the District of Maryland	1:25-cv-00435	February 11, 2025	Dismissed on February 12, 2025, for lack of standing.		
Jane Does 1-2 v. Office of Personnel Management	U.S. District Court for the District of Columbia	1:25-cv-00234	January 27, 2025			
Center for Biological Diversity v. U.S. Department of Interior, et al.	U.S. District Court for the District of Columbia	1:25-cv-00612	March 3, 2025			

== See also ==
- Response to the Department of Government Efficiency
- United States federal agencies targeted by the Department of Government Efficiency
- Legal affairs of the second Donald Trump presidency
- Targeting of law firms and lawyers under the second Trump administration
- US federal agencies targeted by DOGE
