= Cross Roads, Rankin County, Mississippi =

Cross Roads, Mississippi
- Unincorporated community
- Location within the state of Mississippi
- Coordinates: 32°14′56″N 89°46′15″W
- Country: United States
- State: Mississippi
- County: Rankin
- Elevation: 482 ft (147 m)
- Time zone: UTC-6 (Central (CST))
  - Summer (DST): UTC-5 (CDT)
- GNIS feature ID: 711115

Cross Roads is an unincorporated community in Rankin County, Mississippi, United States.

Cross Roads Church is located in the settlement.
