= Crossroads Community Cathedral =

Church in Connecticut, United States

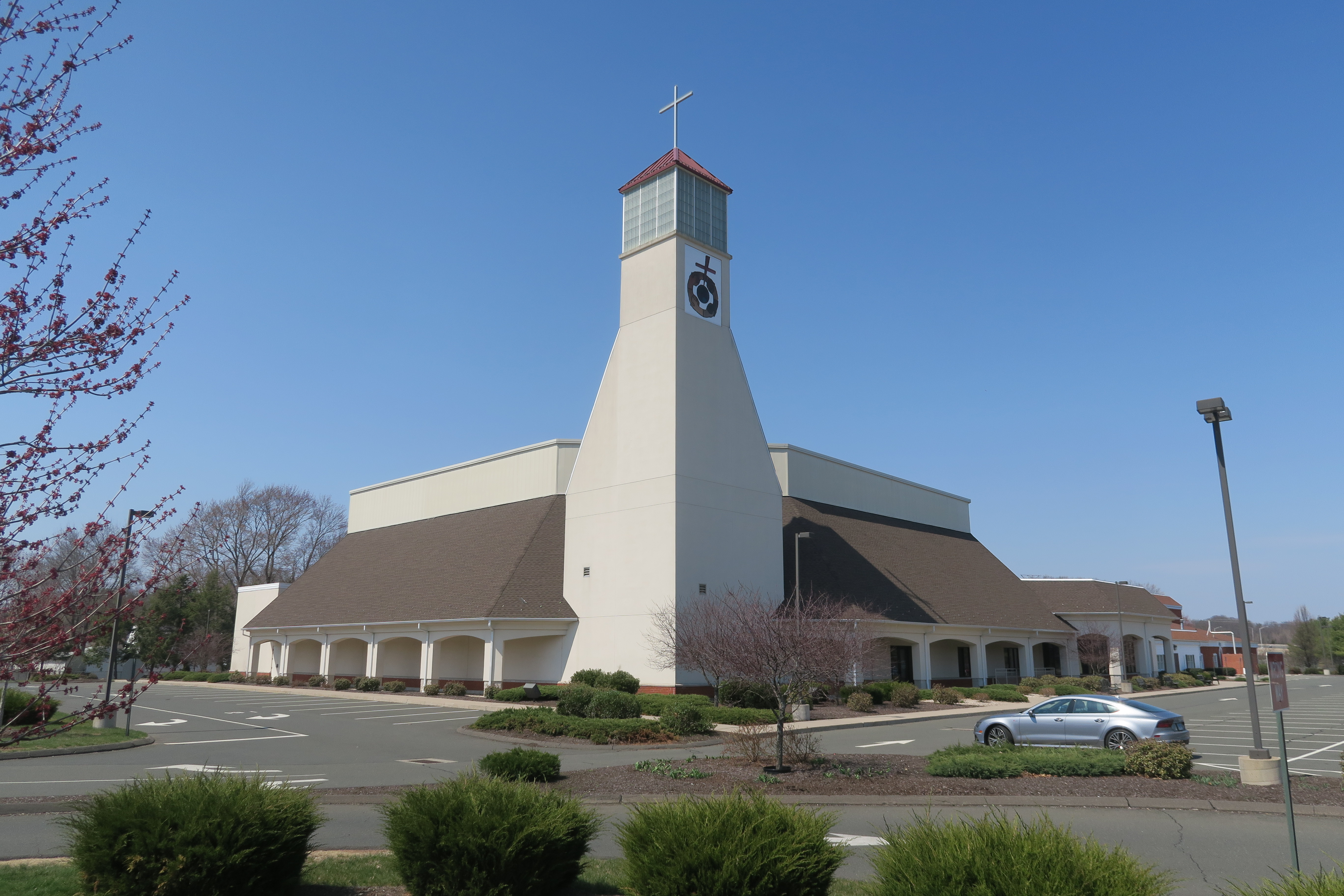
- Multicultural, Multisite church located at the town line of East Hartford, and Manchester, Connecticut and East Windsor, Connecticut
- Crossroads Community Cathedral
- 41.766726°N 72.578273°W
- Address: East Hartford, Connecticut East Windsor, Connecticut
- Country: United States
- Denomination: Assemblies of God
- Website: www.myccc.church

History
- Founded: 1986

Crossroads Community Cathedral is a multi-cultural church located at the town line of East Hartford, Connecticut, and Manchester. A second campus opened in East Windsor in 2020. Pastor Sean Wiles serves as the senior pastor. Bishop Terry Wiles was the senior pastor of the church and has judicial oversight of churches in Central and South America. The church was originally called First Assembly of God.

Initially a small congregation, Crossroads has seen significant growth over the years and has a strong focus on missionary work. As of 2007, it had a membership of more than 2,500. The church sanctuary includes a stage and seats 900 people in auditorium seating. The church has built over 100 churches in the United States and foreign countries and is known for its multicultural cast in the annual production of the Passion.
