= Crossroads School =

Crossroads School may refer to:

- Crossroads School (Hoover, Alabama)
- Crossroads School (Santa Monica, California), in Santa Monica, California
- Crossroads College Preparatory School, a college preparatory school, founded in 1974, for 7th to 12th grade in St. Louis, Missouri
- Crossroads School (Irmo), in Irmo, South Carolina
