= Calvin Russell (musician) =

American singer-songwriter (1948–2011)

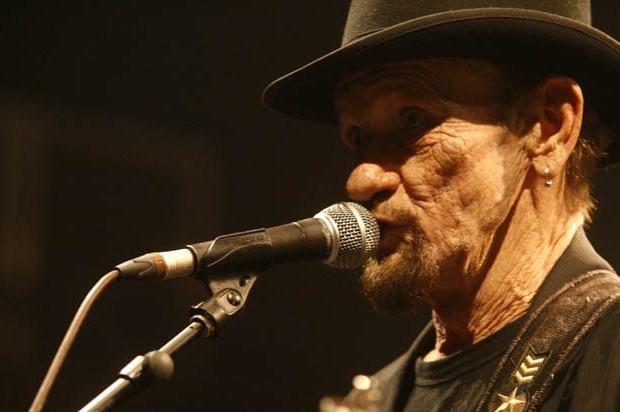
- Calvin Russell, 2007

Background information
- Born: Calvert Russell Kosler; November 1, 1948; Austin, Texas, US
- Died: April 3, 2011 (aged 62) Garfield, Texas, US
- Genres: Americana; Roots rock Blues rock Texas blues Southern rock
- Occupations: Singer-songwriter; Musician; Performer
- Instruments: Electric guitar acoustic guitar voice
- Years active: 1980s–2011
- Labels: MPPA; Full Blast; New Rose; SPV (pre-1994); SPV Recordings; Last Call; Columbia; Freefalls Entertainment; Dixiefrog; XIII BIS

Calvin Russell (born Calvert Russell Kosler; November 1, 1948 – April 3, 2011) was an American blues and roots rock singer-songwriter and guitarist.

== Early life and career ==
Russell was born in Austin, Texas, on November 1, 1948. The sixth in a family of nine, Calvin Russell spent his first five years virtually behind the counter at Sho Nuff Café, where his father Red cooked and his mother Daisy was a waitress. At twelve, Calvin took up guitar and joined his first group, The Cavemen. At fifteen, he ran away to San Francisco. He survived on the road thanks to odd jobs and found himself imprisoned several times for petty teenage offenses. Disillusioned with the American model of financial and social success, he marginalized himself and sold cannabis in order to subsist. Arrested several times, he spent ten years behind bars. On leaving one of his stays in prison, he embarked on a journey through the Great South and crossed the Rio Grande to Piedras Negras and El Paso. This is where he really started to write songs and sing from town to town. He lived as a vagrant, but was caught by the Mexican authorities in the winter of 1985 with American weed in his pockets. Indicted for fraudulent importation of narcotics, he spent a year and a half in the jails of the Mexican government. When he returned to Austin in 1986, he worked as a plumber, but continued to hang out in an alcohol and drug environment. He rubbed shoulders with many musicians, including Townes Van Zandt, Willie Nelson, and Leon Russell.

Three years later, in December 1989, during a birthday party at the Continent Club of Austin, Russell sang his songs in a corner accompanied by an acoustic guitar. Nobody paid attention to him except Patrick Mathé, the boss of the French record company New Rose, who regularly visited Austin. Intrigued as much by the singer's physique as by the quality of his compositions, Patrick Mathé contacted Calvin Russell who left him a cassette. This chance encounter gave birth to the album A Crack In Time that New Rose published in France in early 1990. The reception was excellent and Calvin wasted no time in coming to France to promote it. The following year, he released Sounds From The Fourth World, also recorded in Austin with Joe Gracey. Russell started touring extensively in France, filling clubs, while in Texas he was largely ignored. Many newspaper pages were devoted to his European career, but without profit for his music.

In 1992, Russell returned to the forefront with Soldier. Following on from the previous two albums, he recorded it again at Arlyn Studios, but production this time was under the direction of Jim Dickinson. At the beginning of 1994 appeared Le Voyageur, a live album recorded at the Olympia, the Élysée-Montmartre, the Exo 7 in Rouen and the Zig-Zag in Orléans, reflecting a marathon tour in which Russell gave 178 concerts in Europe within a single year.

In 1995, Dream Of The Dog was released, a turning point in his career. 'Dream Of The Dog' is the title of an old Indian legend. The sleeve, which reproduced the designs on an Indian blanket, revealed Calvin's Comanche origins, with some of the symbols originating from his great-grandmother's tribe.

Russell's next album, (recorded and mixed in Memphis), was decidedly bluesy and satisfied both fans and purists alike. In between preparing his next album, Russell released the best of collection This Is My Life, which included three new titles: "Forever Young", "Texas Song" and "It's All Over Now".

As This Is My Life (1998) appeared, Russell's teenage past resurfaced with violence during a stop at a gas station in Texas. A policeman noticed the dirty windows of his car and asked him to get out. After finding out that Russell was a former prisoner, the officer called for dog handlers, who found cannabis in his possession. Russell's passport was confiscated, and this incident could have led to the cancellation of all his suspended sentences, and 10 years in prison. Eventually things got better, with semi-supervised release under pardon.

== Illness and death ==
On April 3, 2011, Russell died in Garfield, Texas, after a lengthy battle with liver cancer at the age of 62. He is survived by Swiss-born wife, Cynthia, who continues to live in Central Texas and son, Justin. Russell is buried at Cook-Walden Capital Parks Cemetery and Mausoleum in Pflugerville, Texas.

== Select discography ==
=== Solo releases ===
==== Albums ====
- 1990: A Crack in Time (New Rose/SPV Recordings)
- 1991: Sounds From The Fourth World (New Rose/SPV Recordings)
- 1992: Soldier (New Rose/SPV)
- 1993: Le Voyageur – Live (New Rose/SPV)
- 1995: Dream of the Dog (SPV Recordings)
- 1997: Calvin Russell (Last Call/SPV Recordings/Columbia)
- 1999: Sam (SPV Recordings/Columbia)
- 2000: Crossroad – Live (Last Call)
- 2001: Rebel Radio (SPV Recordings/Freefalls Entertainment/Dixiefrog)
- 2005: In Spite Of It All (SPV Recordings)
- 2006: Live at the Kremlin (New Rose)
- 2007: Unrepentant (XIII BIS)
- 2009: Dawg Eat Dawg (XIII BIS)
- 2010: Contrabendo – Live (XIII BIS)
- 2011: The Last Call, In The Heat of a Night.. – Live CD/DVD (XIII BIS)

==== Singles ====
- 1985: "Behind eight Ball/Baby I Love You" (MPPA)
- 1991: "You're My Baby/Baby I Love" (New Rose)
- 1991: "Crossroads/"Rockin' The Republicans" (New Rose)
- 1992: "Soldier" (New Rose)
- 1993: "This Is Your World" (New Rose)
- 1997: "Crossroads" (Columbia)

==== Compilations ====
- 1997: The Story Of Calvin Russell – This Is My Life (SPV Recordings/Columbia)
- 2004: A Man in Full – The Best of Calvin Russell (Last Call)

=== Collaborative releases ===
==== Albums ====
- 1988: The Characters – Act I (Full Blast)
