= Crossroads Mall (Florida) =

- Location: Clearwater, Florida, United States
- Coordinates: 27°54′49.83″N 82°43′35.76″W
- Opened: September 1984; 42 years ago
- Closed: August 2005; 21 years ago
- Previous names: Bay Area Outlet Mall
- Floor area: 280,000 square feet (26,000 m^{2})
- Floors: 1

Crossroads Mall was a shopping mall located at the intersection of U.S. Route 19 and Roosevelt Boulevard on the border of Clearwater and Largo, Florida.

== History ==
The mall was opened in September 1984 as Bay Area Outlet Mall. Two years after the complex opened, its owners were asked by Pinellas County officials to pay for road improvements necessitated by mall traffic. Original tenants included TJ Maxx and Bealls. Although the mall was foreclosed on in 1997, a Ross Dress for Less store was added the same year.

By early 2005, the complex was almost entirely vacant and slated for redevelopment. In 2005, Walmart announced that it would buy the mall and replace it with a supercenter, but the plan ultimately fell through.

The property was purchased by developer Boulder Venture South LLC for $26 million in May 2005. At the time, only seven stores remained in operation. It officially closed its doors in August 2005, and was razed in 2007.
