= Cross Roads Church =

Historic church in Maryland, United States

- Baldwin Hall (Cross Roads Church)
- U.S. National Register of Historic Places
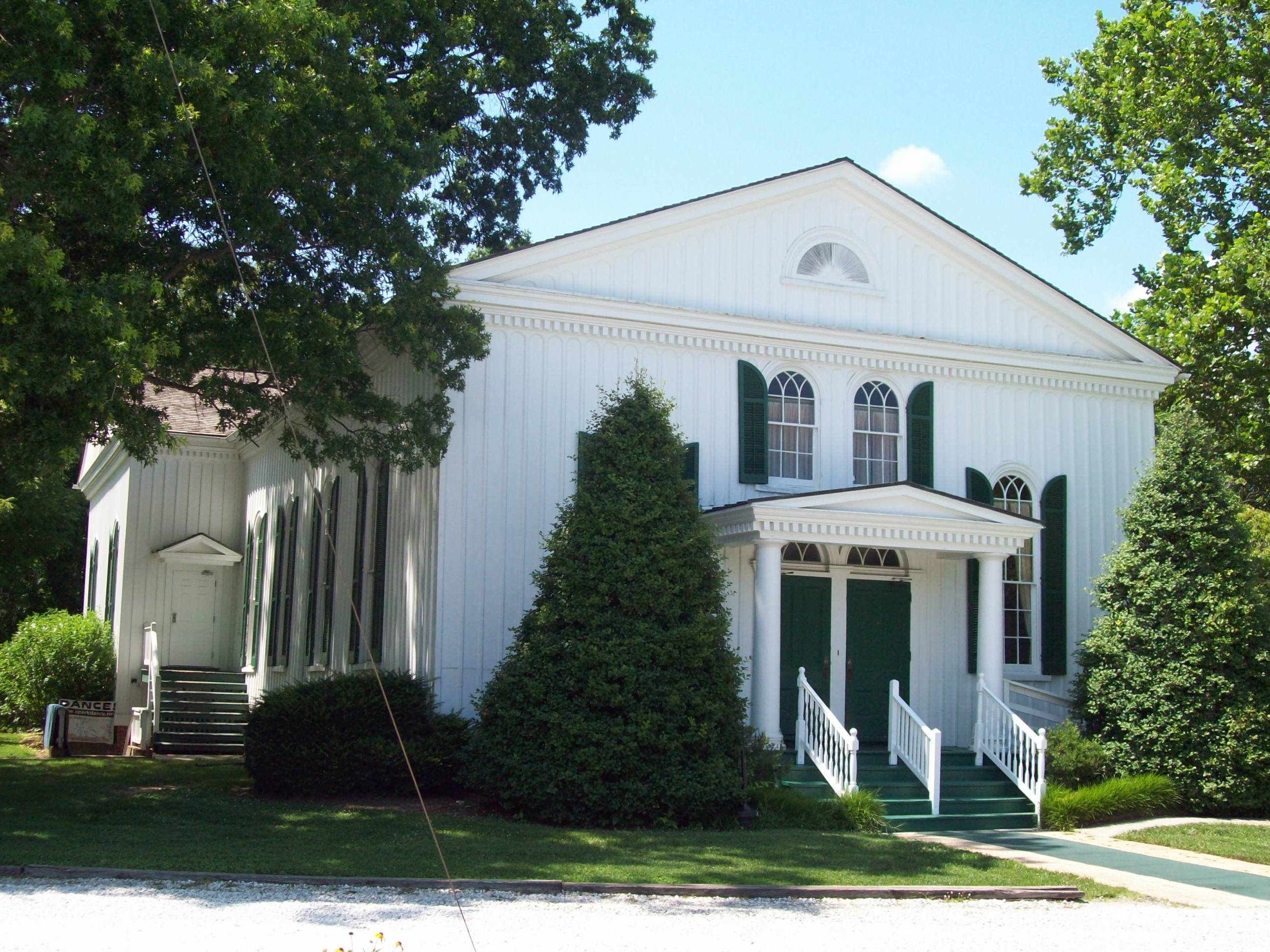
- Cross Roads Church, Baldwin Hall, July 2009

- Location within Maryland Location within the United States
- Location: 911 Old General's Highway, Millersville, Maryland, U.S.
- Coordinates: 39°3′34″N 76°37′43″W
- Area: 2 acres (0.81 ha)
- Built: 1861
- Architectural style: Italianate
- NRHP reference No.: 83002922
- Added to NRHP: February 10, 1983

Baldwin Hall, also known as the Cross Roads Church, was built as the Severn Crossroads Methodist Episcopal Church and is currently a historic church at Millersville, Anne Arundel County, Maryland. It is a one-story gable-front frame structure in the Italianate and Carpenter Gothic-styles built in 1861. It was moved about 1930 and again in 1981. An addition, constructed about 1933, duplicates the exterior detailing of the original part. It is currently operated by the Severn Cross Roads Foundation, Inc., as a wedding and banquet facility known as Historic Baldwin Hall.

It was listed on the National Register of Historic Places in 1983.
