= Crossroad (Calvin Russell album) =

Album by Calvin Russell, released in 2000

Live album by Calvin Russell
- Released: November 2000
- Recorded: 2000
- Genre: Texas Blues
- Length: 66:55
- Label: Last Call Records
- Producer: Patrick Mathé

Crossroad is an album by Calvin Russell, released in 2000. It was recorded at Lausanne's Bagdad Studio in living condition, in front of French speaking spectators.

== Track listing ==
1. "Where The Blues Get Born" 3:07
2. "One Meat Ball" 4:37
3. "Let The Music Play" 4:21
4. "A Crack In Time" 3:38
5. "Time Flies" 3:35
6. "Soldier" 4:54
7. "Little Stars" 4:38
8. "Rats And Roaches" 3:01
9. "Crossroads" 4:59
10. "Behind The 8 Ball" 4:51
11. "Sam Brown" 5:13
12. "Wild Wild West" 3:52
13. "This Is Your World" 5:36
14. "That Wouldn't Be Enough" 3:07
15. "I Gave My Soul To You" 3:30
16. "Somewhere Over The Rainbow" 5:22
