= 2025 U.S. federal deferred resignation program =

2025 resignation offer to US civil servants

The deferred resignation program (DRP) was an offer given to employees of the U.S. federal government near the start of the second Trump administration. The program started with a memo titled "Fork in the Road" sent on January 28, 2025, by the U.S. Office of Personnel Management (OPM) to all employees of the U.S. federal civil service. The memo, the first mass message to all roughly two million federal employees, offered the DRP for those unwilling to work under the second presidency of Donald Trump. The memo led to confusion about its authorship and legality, with several federal employee labor unions and political leaders advising employees not to accept the offer. Ultimately, about 6.7% of the federal civilian workforce resigned under the program, with more than 154,000 drawing a full salary for more than 6 months.

== History ==
=== Background ===
During the 2024 United States presidential election, then-candidate Donald Trump proposed downsizing the federal civil service and publicly considered a potential role for businessman Elon Musk. After the election, Trump and Musk announced the Department of Government Efficiency, who proclaimed that they intended to eliminate wasteful spending. Several high-profile members of what Politico and Vox call the "tech right", including Musk and Marc Andreessen, have expressed desires to restructure the federal civil service to better support Trump's agenda.

On the first day of Trump's administration, he issued the presidential memorandum "Return to In-Person Work", directing agencies to cancel all remote work agreements. Similarly, the administration directed OPM to categorize some employees under the controversial Policy/Career appointment authority, removing competitive service job protections for positions considered "policy-related".

In the first week of Trump's administration, rapid changes to federal programs and reassignments of career staff led to confusion and fear amongst federal employees. On January 25, OPM began sending test emails to all civil servants. As human resources communications in the government are generally kept within each agency, the emails were often flagged as spam and confused employees.

=== Offer ===
On January 28, 2025, an email entitled "Fork in the Road" was sent to the roughly two million civilian employees of the US government. Besides the immediately preceding test emails, it was the first-ever mass email to all federal civilian employees. According to the memo, employees who accepted the DRP would be placed on administrative leave, retain all employment benefits, and be paid in full through September 30, 2025, but have no work duties.

Several publications noted the similarities to an offer given to Twitter employees after its acquisition by Elon Musk, including an identical title. A January 28 Wired article uncovered that several high-ranking OPM staff were former employees of Musk, including a recent high school graduate, which Fortune connected to the memo's similarities to that of Twitter. The Washington Post reported that the memo had been drafted and sent entirely by staff close to Musk, bypassing political officials in the White House. Reuters likewise reported that employees of Musk had moved beds into OPM to stay in the director's office around the clock and had locked out career staff, a situation one of the career staff described as a "hostile takeover" of the agency.

OPM excluded from the offer military and U.S. Postal Service workers, as well as immigration enforcement and national security positions. It also allowed agencies to exempt further positions. The Cybersecurity and Infrastructure Security Agency and U.S. Customs and Border Protection exempted their entire staff, and the Social Security Administration exempted a vast majority of its positions. The Department of Veterans Affairs stated that its agencies reserved the option of rejecting resignation requests from those in essential services such as health care, public safety, and law enforcement.

On January 31, OPM approved Voluntary Early Retirement Authority for all agencies. On February 3, a new deferred resignation agreement form was sent that provided more details and legal assurances.

=== Implementation ===
More than three-quarters of employees surveyed by Federal News Network told the news agency that they did not plan to accept the offer. Of the 11% who intended to accept, more than half already had plans to retire from or otherwise leave the civil service. While the White House reportedly expected about 10% of the federal civilian work force to accept the deal, only about 40,000 employees – or about 2% of the workforce – had accepted the deal by February 5, the day before the original deadline.

Some of those who accepted the offer were later told that they were "exempt". Some of those terminated had to be hastily re-hired, notably workers in nuclear safety roles. Contact details had not been collected, making re-hiring logistically difficult. In other cases, probationary employees who had accepted the offer were subsequently laid off and told that "a determination was made that probationary employees are not eligible and will be terminated", even though this was not among the exclusions specified in the memo.

As July 31, 2025, more than 154,000 federal employees were still being paid full salaries to be on administrative leave, about 6.7% of the civilian workforce.

== Legality ==
The legality of the offer has been questioned by many. Patty Murray, vice chair of the United States Senate Committee on Appropriations, warned that Congress had not given statutory authority nor appropriated funds for the offer. Senator Tim Kaine likewise cautioned that there may not be authority to pay those who take the offer, warning employees that they may be "stiffed" by the administration if they resign.

The federal government was funded through a continuing resolution set to expire on March 15, 2025, despite the offer to pay salaries through September 30, 2025. The Antideficiency Act means that the US government cannot enter into unfunded contracts. On February 5, several Democratic lawmakers sent a letter to Acting Office of Personnel Management Director Charles Ezell, describing the program as "legally dubious" and requesting clarification on how it complies with the Antideficiency Act.

A lawsuit filed by federal employee unions alleged that the DRP violated the Administrative Procedure Act. On February 6, 2025, Judge George A. O'Toole Jr. of the U.S. District Court for the District of Massachusetts placed the deadline on hold pending a February 10 hearing. He lifted the suspension on February 12, ruling that the unions lacked standing and his court did not have jurisdiction.

== Response ==
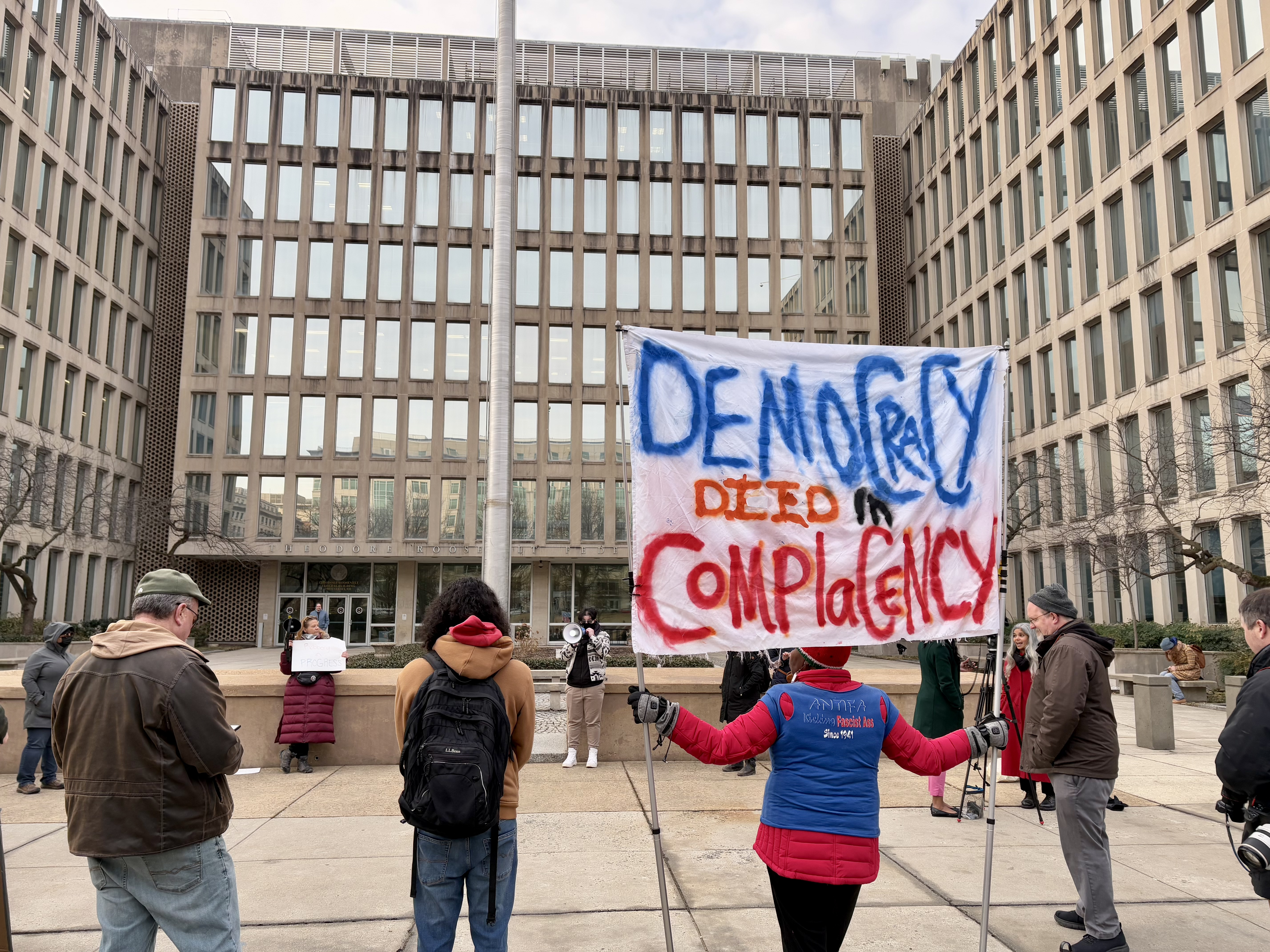
Protesters outside the Theodore Roosevelt Federal Building on February 3

=== Unions ===
Labor unions representing federal civil servants opposed the memo and advised their members not to take the offer. The American Federation of Government Employees stated that the resignation scheme should be viewed as coercive rather than voluntary as it immediately followed the annulment of remote work and other workplace benefits. The National Treasury Employees Union likewise indicated that the offer was intended to "scare" employees into accepting, and strongly urged its members to ignore it. The International Federation of Professional and Technical Engineers found the offer to be too vague to advise members to accept.

=== Protests ===
On February 3, several federal employees protested outside the headquarters of OPM. Some protestors used forks to symbolise the Musk letter.

==== Spoon emoji ====
Workers "embraced the digital cutlery" using the spoon emoji (🥄) – a symbol from the protests of the Twitter layoffs, to protest the "fork" offer. The spoon emoji has been removed from some work platforms, after employees "unleashed a torrent of spoon emojis in the chat that accompanied an organization-wide, 600-person video conference with new leader Thomas Shedd, a former Tesla engineer". Some have also added the emoji to their Slack status.

== See also ==
- Civil service reform in the United States
- Civil Service Reform Act of 1978 – United States legislation
- Federal Labor Relations Authority – U.S. government agency
- Fork in the road (metaphor) – Metaphor for making a decision
- General Schedule (US civil service pay scale) – Pay scale for some employees of the Federal Government of the United States
- United States Merit Systems Protection Board – Independent quasi-judicial agency
