= Psychological abuse =

Mental or emotional harm inflicted on a person

Psychological abuse, often known as emotional abuse or mental abuse, is a form of abuse characterized by a person knowingly or intentionally exposing another person to a behavior that results in psychological trauma, including anxiety, chronic depression, clinical depression or post-traumatic stress disorder amongst other psychological reactions.

It is often associated with situations of controlling behavior in abusive relationships, and may include bullying, gaslighting, abuse in the workplace, amongst other behaviors that may cause an individual to feel unsafe.

== General definition ==
Clinicians and researchers have offered different definitions of psychological abuse. According to current research, the terms "psychological abuse" and "emotional abuse" are commonly used interchangeably, and as unassociated with physical abuse and accordingly physical violence, as opposed to "psychological violence". Usually, "emotional abuse" refers to any abuse that is emotional rather than physical, though experts often continue to find it difficult to recognize and operationally define it, and "experience uncertainty about proving it legally."

Emotional abuse can take several forms. Three general patterns of abusive behavior include aggressing, denying, and minimizing; "Withholding is another form of denying. Withholding includes refusing to listen, to communicate, and emotionally withdrawing as punishment." Even though there is no established definition for emotional abuse, emotional abuse can possess a definition beyond verbal and psychological abuse. Blaming, shaming, and name calling are a few verbally abusive behaviors that can affect a victim emotionally. The victim's self-worth and emotional well-being are altered and even diminished by the verbal abuse, resulting in an emotionally abused victim.

The victim may experience severe psychological effects. This would involve the tactics of brainwashing, which can fall under psychological abuse as well, but emotional abuse consists of the manipulation of the victim's emotions. The victim may feel their emotions are being affected by the abuser to such an extent that the victim may no longer recognize their own feelings regarding the issues the abuser is trying to control. The result is the victim's self-concept and independence are systematically taken away.

The U.S. Department of Justice defines emotionally abusive traits as causing fear by intimidation, threatening physical harm to self, partner, children, partner's family, friends, destruction of pets, property, and forcing isolation from family, friends, school, or work. More subtle emotionally abusive behaviors include insults, putdowns, arbitrary and unpredictable behavior, and gaslighting (e.g. the denial that previous abusive incidents occurred). Modern technology has led to new forms of abuse, by text messaging and online cyber-bullying.

In 1996, Health Canada argued that emotional abuse is "based on power and control", and defined emotional abuse as including rejecting, degrading, terrorizing, isolating, corrupting/exploiting and "denying emotional responsiveness" as characteristic of emotional abuse.

Several studies have argued that an isolated incident of verbal aggression, dominant conduct or jealous behaviors does not constitute the term "psychological abuse". Rather, it is defined by a pattern of such behaviors, unlike physical and sexual maltreatment where only one incident is necessary to label it as abuse. Tomison and Tucci write, "emotional abuse is characterized by a climate or pattern of behavior(s) occurring over time ... Thus, 'sustained' and 'repetitive' are the crucial components of any definition of emotional abuse." Andrew Vachss, an author, attorney, and former sex crimes investigator, defines emotional abuse as "the systematic diminishment of another. It may be intentional or subconscious (or both), but it is always a course of conduct, not a single event."

== Prevalence ==
=== Intimate relationships ===
When discussing the different types of psychological abuse in terms of domestically violent relationships, it is important to recognize the 4 different types; Denigrating Damage to Partner's Self-Image or Esteem, Passive Aggressive Withholding of Emotional Support, Threatening Behavior, and Restricting Personal Territory and Freedom:

- Denigrating Damage refers to an individual using verbal aggression like yelling towards their partner that is delivered as profane and derogatory.
- Passive Aggressive Withholding of Emotional Support refers to an individual intentionally avoiding and withdrawing themselves from their partner in an attempt to be neglectful and emotionally abandoning.
- Threatening Behavior refers to an individual making verbal threats towards their partner that could imply eliciting physical harm, threats of divorce, lying, and threats of reckless behavior that could put their safety at risk.
- Restricting Personal Territory and Freedom refers to the isolation of social support from family and friends. This could include taking away partner's autonomy and having a lack of personal boundaries.

It has been reported that at least 80% of women who have entered the criminal justice system due to partner violence have also experienced psychological abuse from their partner. This partner violence is also known as domestic abuse.

Domestic abuse, defined as chronic mistreatment in marriage, families, dating, and other intimate relationships, can include emotionally abusive behavior. Although psychological abuse does not always lead to physical abuse, physical abuse in domestic relationships is nearly always preceded and accompanied by psychological abuse. Murphy and O'Leary reported that psychological aggression is the most reliable predictor of later physical aggression.

A 2012 review by Capaldi et al., which evaluated risk factors for intimate partner violence (IPV), noted that psychological abuse has been shown to be both associated with and common in IPV. High levels of verbal aggression and relationship conflict, "practically akin to psychological aggression", strongly predicted IPV; male jealousy in particular was associated with female injuries from IPV.

Attempts to define and describe violence and abuse in hetero-normative intimate relationships can become contentious as different studies present different conclusions about whether men or women are the primary instigators. For instance, a 2005 study by Hamel reports that "men and women physically and emotionally abuse each other at equal rates." Basile found that psychological aggression was effectively bidirectional in cases where heterosexual and homosexual couples went to court for domestic disturbances.

A 2007 study of Spanish college students aged 18–27 found that psychological aggression (as measured by the Conflict Tactics Scale) is so pervasive in dating relationships that it can be regarded as a normalized element of dating, and that women are substantially more likely to exhibit psychological aggression. Similar findings have been reported in other studies. Strauss et al. found that female intimate partners in heterosexual relationships were more likely than males to use psychological aggression, including threats to hit or throw an object.

A study of young adults by Giordano et al. found that females in intimate heterosexual relationships were more likely than males to threaten to use a knife or gun against their partner. While studies allege that women use violence in intimate relationships as often or more often than men, women's violence is typically self-defensive rather than aggressive.

In 1996, the National Clearinghouse on Family Violence, for Health Canada, reported that 39% of married women or common-law wives suffered emotional abuse by husbands/partners; and a 1995 survey of women 15 and over 36–43% reported emotional abuse during childhood or adolescence, and 39% experienced emotional abuse in marriage/dating; this report does not address boys or men suffering emotional abuse from families or intimate partners. A BBC radio documentary on domestic abuse, including emotional maltreatment, reports that 20% of men and 30% of women have been abused by a spouse or other intimate partner.

=== Child emotional abuse ===
Psychological abuse of a child is commonly defined as a pattern of behavior by parents or caregivers that can seriously interfere with a child's cognitive, emotional, psychological, or social development. According to the DSM-5, Child Psychological Abuse is defined as verbal or symbolic acts given by parent or caregiver which can result in significant psychological harm. Examples are yelling, comparing to others, name-calling, blaming, gaslighting, manipulating, and normalizing abuse due to the status of being underage.

Some parents may emotionally and psychologically harm their children because of stress, poor parenting skills, social isolation, and lack of available resources or inappropriate expectations of their children. Straus and Field report that psychological aggression is a pervasive trait of American families: "verbal attacks on children, like physical attacks, are so prevalent as to be just about universal." A 2008 study by English, et al. found that fathers and mothers were equally likely to be verbally aggressive towards their children.

=== Elder emotional abuse ===
Choi and Mayer performed a study on elder abuse (causing harm or distress to an older person), with results showing that 10.5% of the participants were victims of "emotional/psychological abuse", which was most often perpetrated by a relative of the victim. Of 1288 cases in 2002–2004, 1201 individuals, 42 couples, and 45 groups were found to have been abused. Of these, 70% were female. Psychological abuse (59%) and financial abuse (42%) were the most frequently identified types of abuse. One study found that the overall prevalence rate of abused elderly in Hong Kong was 21.4%. Out of this percentage, 20.8% reported being verbally abused.

=== Workplace ===
Rates of reported emotional abuse in the workplace vary, with studies showing 10%, 24%, and 36% of respondents indicating persistent and substantial emotional abuse from coworkers. Keashly and Jagatic found that males and females commit "emotionally abusive behaviors" in the workplace at roughly similar rates. In a web-based survey, Namie found that women were more likely to engage in workplace bullying, such as name calling, and that the average length of abuse was 16.5 months.

Pai and Lee found that the incidence of workplace violence typically occurs more often in younger workers. "Younger age may be a reflection of lack of job experience, resulting in [an inability] to identify or prevent potentially abusive situations... Another finding showed that lower education is a risk factor for violence." This study also reports that 51.4% of the workers surveyed have already experienced verbal abuse, and 29.8% of them have encountered workplace bullying and mobbing.

== Characteristics of abusers ==
In their review of data from the Dunedin Multidisciplinary Health and Development Study (a longitudinal birth cohort study) Moffitt et al. report that while men exhibit more aggression overall, sex is not a reliable predictor of interpersonal aggression, including psychological aggression.

The DARVO study found that no matter what gender a person is, aggressive people share a cluster of traits, including high rates of suspicion and jealousy; sudden and drastic mood swings; poor self-control; and higher than average rates of approval of violence and aggression. Moffitt et al. also argue that antisocial men exhibit two distinct types of interpersonal aggression (one against strangers, the other against intimate female partners), while antisocial women are rarely aggressive against anyone other than intimate male partners or their own children.

Abusers may aim to avoid household chores or exercise total control of family finances. Abusers can be very manipulative, often recruiting friends, law officers and court officials, and even the victim's family to their side, while shifting blame to the victim. A victim may internalize the abuse and may form future relationships with abusers.

== Effects ==
=== Abuse of intimate partners ===
Most victims of psychological abuse within intimate relationships often experience changes to their psyche and actions. This varies throughout the various types and lengths of emotional abuse. Long-term emotional abuse has long term debilitating effects on a person's sense of self and integrity. Often, research shows that emotional abuse is a precursor to physical abuse when three particular forms of emotional abuse are present in the relationship: threats, restriction of the abused party and damage to the victim's property.

Psychological abuse is often not recognized by survivors of domestic violence as abuse. A study of college students by Goldsmith and Freyd report that many who have experienced emotional abuse do not characterize the mistreatment as abusive. Additionally, Goldsmith and Freyd show that these people also tend to exhibit higher than average rates of alexithymia (difficulty identifying and processing their own emotions). This is often the case when referring to victims of abuse within intimate relationships, as non-recognition of the actions as abuse may be a coping or defense mechanism in order to either seek to master, minimize or tolerate stress or conflict.

Marital or relationship dissatisfaction can be caused by psychological abuse or aggression. In a 2007 study, Laurent et al. report that psychological aggression in young couples is associated with decreased satisfaction for both partners: "psychological aggression may serve as an impediment to couples' development because it reflects less mature coercive tactics and an inability to balance self/other needs effectively." In a 2008 study on relationship dissatisfaction in adolescents Walsh and Shulman explain, "The more psychologically aggressive females were, the less satisfied were both partners. The unique importance of males' behavior was found in the form of withdrawal, a less mature conflict negotiation strategy. Males' withdrawal during joint discussions predicted increased satisfaction."

There are many different responses to psychological abuse. Jacobson et al. found that women report markedly higher rates of fear during marital conflicts. However, a rejoinder argued that Jacobson's results were invalid due to men and women's drastically differing interpretations of questionnaires. Coker et al. found that the effects of mental abuse were similar whether the victim was male or female. A 1998 study of male college students by Simonelli & Ingram found that men who were emotionally abused by their female partners exhibited higher rates of chronic depression than the general population. Pimlott-Kubiak and Cortina found that severity and duration of abuse were the only accurate predictors of after effects of abuse; sex of perpetrator or victim were not reliable predictors.

=== Abuse of children ===
The effects of psychological abuse on children can involve a variety of mental health concerns such as post-traumatic stress disorder, major depressive disorder, personality disorders, low self-esteem, aggression, anxiety, and emotional unresponsiveness. These effects can be exemplified by the constant criticism, regular living with threats, or being rejected, that can be exemplified by withholding love and support as well as not having any guidance from the guardians of the children.

English et al. report that children specifically whose families are characterized by interpersonal violence, including psychological aggression and verbal aggression, may exhibit these disorders. Additionally, English et al. report that the impact of emotional abuse "did not differ significantly" from that of physical abuse. Johnson et al. report that, in a survey of female patients, 24% suffered emotional abuse, and that this group experienced higher rates of gynecological problems. In their study of men emotionally abused by a wife/partner or parent, Hines and Malley-Morrison report that victims exhibit high rates of post-traumatic stress disorder and drug addiction, including alcoholism.

Glaser reports, "An infant who is severely deprived of basic emotional nurturance, even though physically well cared for, can fail to thrive and can eventually die. Babies with less severe emotional deprivation can grow into anxious and insecure children who are slow to develop and who have low self-esteem." Glaser also informs that the abuse impacts the child in a number of ways, especially on their behavior, including: "insecurity, poor self-esteem, destructive behavior, angry acts (such as fire setting and animal cruelty), withdrawal, poor development of basic skills, alcohol or drug abuse, suicide, difficulty forming relationships and unstable job histories."

Oberlander et al. performed a study which discovered that among the youth, those with a history of maltreatment showed that emotional distress is a predictor of early initiation of sexual intercourse. Oberlander et al. state, "A childhood history of maltreatment, including... psychological abuse, and neglect, has been identified as a risk factor for early initiation of sexual intercourse ... In families where child maltreatment had occurred, children were more likely to experience heightened emotional distress and subsequently to engage in sexual intercourse by age 14. It is possible that maltreated youth feel disconnected from families that did not protect them and subsequently seek sexual relationships to gain support, seek companionship, or enhance their standing with peers."

=== Abuse in the workplace ===
Psychological abuse has been found present within the workplace as evidenced by previous research. Namie's study of workplace emotional abuse found that 31% of women and 21% of men who reported workplace emotional abuse exhibited three key symptoms of post-traumatic stress disorder (hypervigilance, intrusive imagery, and avoidance behaviors). The most common psychological, professional, financial, and social effects of sexual harassment and retaliation are as follows:

- Psychological stress and health impairment, loss of motivation.
- Decreased work or school performance as a result of stressful conditions; increased absenteeism in fear of harassment repetition.
- Having to drop courses, change academic plans, or leave school (loss of tuition) in fear of harassment repetition or as a result of stress.
- Being objectified and humiliated by scrutiny and gossip.
- Loss of trust in environments similar to where the harassment occurred.
- Loss of trust in the types of people that occupy similar positions as the harasser or their colleagues, especially in cases where they are not supportive, difficulties or stress on peer relationships, or relationships with colleagues.
- Effects on sexual life and relationships: can put extreme stress upon relationships with significant others, sometimes resulting in divorce.
- Weakening of support network, or being ostracized from professional or academic circles (friends, colleagues, or family may distance themselves from the victim, or shun him or her altogether).
- Depression, anxiety or panic attacks.
- Sleeplessness or nightmares, difficulty concentrating, headaches, fatigue.
- Eating disorders (weight loss or gain), alcoholism, and feeling powerless or out of control.

== Abuse of the elderly ==
Elderly who have suffered psychological abuse have been found to experience similar outcomes as other population groups such as depression, anxiety, feelings of isolation and neglect, and powerlessness. One study examined 355 Chinese elderly participants (60 and older) and found that 75% of reported abusers were grown-up children of the elderly. Within this study, these individuals suffered outcomes from the abuse, specifically verbal abuse which contributed to their psychological distress.

== Prevention ==
=== In intimate relationships ===
Recognition of abuse is the first step to prevention. It is often difficult for abuse victims to acknowledge their situation and to seek help. For those who do seek help, research has shown that people who participate in an intimate partner violence prevention program report less psychological aggression toward their targets of psychological abuse, and reported victimization from psychological abuse decreased over time for the treatment group.

There are non-profit organizations that provide support and prevention services such as the National Domestic Violence Hotline, The Salvation Army, and Benefits.gov.

=== In the family ===
Child abuse in the sole form of emotional/psychological maltreatment is often the most difficult to identify and prevent, as government organizations, such as Child Protective Services in the US, is often the only method of intervention, and the institute "must have demonstrable evidence that harm to a child has been done before they can intervene. Due to this a lot of victims may stay in the care of their abuser. Since emotional abuse doesn't result in physical evidence such as bruising or malnutrition, it can be very hard to diagnose." Some researchers have, however, begun to develop methods to diagnose and treat such abuse, including the ability to: identify risk factors, provide resources to victims and their families, and ask appropriate questions to help identify the abuse.

=== In the workplace ===
The majority of companies within the United States provide access to a human resources department, in which to report cases of psychological/emotional abuse. Also, many managers are required to participate in conflict management programs, in order to ensure the workplace maintains an "open and respectful atmosphere, with tolerance for diversity and where the existence of interpersonal frustration and friction is accepted but also properly managed." Organizations must adopt zero-tolerance policies for professional verbal abuse. Education and coaching are needed to help employees to improve their skills when responding to professional-to-professional verbal abuse.

== Popular perceptions ==
Several studies found double standards in how people tend to view emotional abuse by men versus emotional abuse by women. Follingstad et al. found that, when rating hypothetical vignettes of psychological abuse in marriages, professional psychologists tend to rate male abuse of females as more serious than identical scenarios describing female abuse of males: "the stereotypical association between physical aggression and males appears to extend to an association of psychological abuse and males".

Similarly, Sorenson and Taylor randomly surveyed a group of Los Angeles, California residents for their opinions of hypothetical vignettes of abuse in heterosexual relationships. Their study found that abuse committed by women, including emotional and psychological abuse such as controlling or humiliating behavior, was typically viewed as less serious or detrimental than identical abuse committed by men. Additionally, Sorenson and Taylor found that respondents had a broader range of opinions about female perpetrators, representing a lack of clearly defined mores when compared to responses about male perpetrators.

When considering the emotional state of psychological abusers, psychologists have focused on aggression as a contributing factor. While it is typical for people to consider males to be the more aggressive of the two sexes, researchers have studied female aggression to help understand psychological abuse patterns in situations involving female abusers. According to Walsh and Shluman, "The higher rates of female initiated aggression [including psychological aggression] may result, in part, from adolescents' attitudes about the unacceptability of male aggression and the relatively less negative attitudes toward female aggression". This concept that females are raised with fewer restrictions on aggressive behaviors (possibly due to the anxiety over aggression being focused on males) is a possible explanation for women who utilize aggression when being mentally abusive.

Some researchers have become interested in discovering exactly why women are usually not considered to be abusive. Hamel's 2007 study found that a "prevailing patriarchal conception of intimate partner violence" led to a systematic reluctance to study women who psychologically and physically abuse their male partners. These findings state that existing cultural norms show males as more dominant and are therefore more likely to begin abusing their significant partners.

Dutton found that men who are emotionally or physically abused often encounter victim blaming that erroneously presumes the man either provoked or deserved the mistreatment by their female partners. Similarly, domestic violence victims will often blame their own behavior, rather than the violent actions of the abuser. Victims may try continually to alter their behavior and circumstances in order to please their abuser. Often, this results in further dependence of the individual on their abuser, as they may often change certain aspects of their lives that limit their resources. A 2002 study concluded that emotional abusers frequently aim to exercise total control of different aspects of family life. This behavior is only supported when the victim of the abuse aims to please their abuser.

Many abusers are able to control their victims in a manipulative manner, utilizing methods to persuade others to conform to the wishes of the abuser, rather than to force them to do something they do not wish to do. Simon argues that because aggression in abusive relationships can be carried out subtly and covertly through various manipulation and control tactics, victims often do not perceive the true nature of the relationship until conditions worsen considerably.

== Cultural causes ==
A researcher in 1988 said that wife abuse stems from "normal psychological and behavioral patterns of most men ... feminists seek to understand why men, in general, use physical force against their partners and what functions this serves for a society in a given historical context". Dobash and Dobash (1979) said that "Men who assault their wives are living up to cultural prescriptions that are cherished in Western society--aggressiveness, male dominance and female subordination--and they are using physical force as a means to enforce that dominance," while Walker claims that men exhibit a "socialized androcentric need for power".

While some women are aggressive and dominating to male partners, a 2003 report concluded that the majority of abuse in heterosexual partnerships, at about 80% in the US, is perpetrated by men. (Critics stress that this Department of Justice study examines crime figures, and does not specifically address domestic abuse figures. While the categories of crime and domestic abuse may cross-over, many instances of domestic abuse are either not regarded as crimes or reported to police—critics thus argue that it is inaccurate to regard the DOJ study as a comprehensive statement on domestic abuse.) A 2002 study reports that ten percent of violence in the UK, overall, is by females against males. However, more recent data specifically regarding domestic abuse (including emotional abuse) report that 3 in 10 women, and 1 in 5 men, have experienced domestic abuse.

One source said that legal systems have in the past endorsed these traditions of male domination, and it is only in recent years that abusers have begun to be punished for their behavior. In 1879, a Harvard University law scholar wrote, "The cases in the American courts are uniform against the right of the husband to use any chastisement, moderate or otherwise, toward the wife, for any purpose."

While recognizing that researchers have done valuable work and highlighted neglected topics critics suggest that the male cultural domination hypothesis for abuse is untenable as a generalized explanation for numerous reasons:

- A 1989 study concluded that many variables (racial, ethnic, cultural and subcultural, nationality, religion, family dynamics, and mental illness) make it very difficult or impossible to define male and female roles in any meaningful way that apply to the entire population.
- A 1995 study concluded that disagreements about power-sharing in relationships are more strongly associated with abuse than are imbalances of power.
- Peer-reviewed studies have produced inconsistent results when directly examining patriarchal beliefs and wife abuse. Yllo and Straus (1990) said that "low status" women in the United States suffered higher rates of spousal abuse; however, a rejoinder argued that Yllo and Straus's interpretive conclusions were "confusing and contradictory". Smith (1990) estimated that patriarchal beliefs were a causative factor for only 20% of wife abuse. Campbell (1993) writes that "there is not a simple linear correlation between female status and rates of wife assault." Other studies had similar findings. Additionally, a 1994 study of Hispanic Americans revealed that traditionalist men exhibited lower rates of abuse towards women.
- Studies from the 1980s showed that treatment programs based on the patriarchal privilege model are flawed due to a weak connection between abusiveness and one's cultural or social attitudes.
- A 1992 study challenge the concept that male abuse or control of women is culturally sanctioned, and concluded that abusive men are widely viewed as unsuitable partners for dating or marriage. A 1988 study concluded that a minority of abusive men qualify as pervasively misogynistic. A 1986 study concluded that the majority of men who commit spousal abuse agree that their behavior was inappropriate. A 1970 study concluded that a minority of men approve of spousal abuse under even limited circumstances. Studies from the 1970 and 1980s concluded that the majority of men are non-abusive towards girlfriends or wives for the duration of relationships, contrary to predictions that aggression or abuse towards women is an innate element of masculine culture.
- In 1994, a researcher said that the numerous studies establishing that heterosexual and gay male relationships have lower rates of abuse than lesbian relationships, and the fact that women who have been involved with both men and women were more likely to have been abused by a woman "are difficult to explain in terms of male domination." Additionally, Dutton said that "patriarchy must interact with psychological variables in order to account for the great variation in power-violence data. It is suggested that some forms of psychopathology lead to some men adopting patriarchal ideology to justify and rationalize their own pathology."

A 2010 study said that fundamentalist views of religions tend to reinforce emotional abuse, and that "Gender inequity is usually translated into a power imbalance with women being more vulnerable. This vulnerability is more precarious in traditional patriarchal societies."

Some studies say that fundamentalist religious prohibitions against divorce may make it more difficult for religious men or women to leave an abusive marriage. A 1985 survey of Protestant clergy in the United States by Jim M Alsdurf found that 21% of them agreed that "no amount of abuse would justify a woman's leaving her husband, ever", and 26% agreed with the statement that "a wife should submit to her husband and trust that God would honor her action by either stopping the abuse or giving her the strength to endure it." A 2016 report by the Muslim Women's Network UK cited several barriers for Muslim women in abusive marriages who seek divorce through Sharia Council services. These barriers include: selectively quoting religious text to discourage divorce; blaming the woman for the failed marriage; placing greater weight on the husband's testimony; requiring the woman to present two male witnesses; and pressuring women into mediation or reconciliation rather than granting a divorce, even when domestic violence is present.

== See also ==
- Coercion
- Destabilisation
- Economic abuse
- Emotional blackmail
- Guilt trip
- Isolation to facilitate abuse
- Poisonous pedagogy
- Psychological manipulation
- Psychological trauma
- Silent treatment
