= E-governance =

Application of information technology for delivering government services

Electronic governance or e-governance is the use of information technology to provide government services, information exchange, communication transactions, and integration of different stand-alone systems between government to citizen (G2C), government to business (G2B), government to government (G2G), government to employees (G2E), and back-office processes and interactions within the entire governance framework. Through IT, citizens can access government services through e-governance. The government, citizens, and businesses/interest groups are the three primary target groups that can be identified in governance concepts.

== Government to citizen ==
The goal of government-to-citizen (G2C) e-governance is to offer a variety of ICT services to citizens in an efficient and economical manner and to strengthen the relationship between government and citizens using technology.

There are several methods of G2C e-governance. Two-way communication allows citizens to instant message directly with public administrators, and cast remote electronic votes (electronic voting) and instant opinion voting. These are examples of e-Participation. Other examples included the payment of taxes and services that can be completed online or over the phone. Mundane services such as name or address changes, applying for services or grants, or transferring existing services are more convenient and no longer have to be completed face to face.

=== By country ===
G2C e-governance is unbalanced across the globe as not everyone has Internet access and computing skills, but the United States, European Union, and Asia are ranked the top three in development.

The Federal Government of the United States has a broad framework of G2C technology to enhance citizen access to Government information and services. benefits.gov is an official US government website that informs citizens of benefits they are eligible for and provides information on how to apply for assistance. US State Governments also engage in G2C interaction through the Department of Transportation, Department of Public Safety, United States Department of Health and Human Services, United States Department of Education, and others. As with e-governance on the global level, G2C services vary from state to state. The Digital States Survey ranks states on social measures, digital democracy, e-commerce, taxation, and revenue. The 2012 report shows Michigan and Utah in the lead and Florida and Idaho with the lowest scores. Municipal governments in the United States also use government-to-customer technology to complete transactions and inform the public. Much like states, cities are awarded for innovative technology. Government Technology's "Best of the Web 2012" named Louisville, KY, Arvada, CO, Raleigh, NC, Riverside, CA, and Austin, TX the top five G2C city portals.

European countries were ranked second among all geographic regions. The Single Point of Access for Citizens of Europe supports travel within Europe and Europe is a 1999 initiative supporting an online government. Main focuses are to provide public information, allow customers to have access to basic public services, simplify online procedures, and promote electronic signatures. Estonia is the first and the only country in the world with e-residency which enables anyone in the world outside Estonia to access Estonian online services. One caveat of the Estonia e-residency program is that it does not give e-residents physical rights to the country. This means that unless the e-resident buys land they do not get to participate in the democratic processes. The benefit to e-residents is the opportunity to develop business in the digital European Union market. Neighboring Lithuania launched a similar e-Residency program.

Asia is ranked third in comparison, and there are diverse G2C programs between countries. Singapore's eCitizen Portal is an organized single access point to government information and services. South Korea's Home Tax Service (HTS) provides citizens with 24/7 online services such as tax declaration. Taiwan has top ranking G2C technology including an online motor vehicle services system, which provides 21 applications and payment services to citizens. India's e-governance programs have found success in regional areas. This is likely due to the ability to meet the language and literacy differences among their constituents.India's UPI(Unified Payments Network) has become world's largest digital payments network which allows its users to combine multiple bank accounts into a single app, allowing users to send and receive money without sharing account numbers or other details.

Government-to-Citizen is the communication link between a government and private individuals or residents. Such G2C communication most often refers to that which takes place through information and communication technologies (ICTs), but can also include direct mail and media campaigns. G2C can take place at the federal, state, and local levels. G2C stands in contrast to G2B, or government-to-business networks.

One such Federal G2C network is USA.gov, the United States' official web portal, though there are many other examples from governments around the world.

=== Concerns ===
A full switch to government-to-citizen e-governance will cost a large amount of money in development and implementation. In addition, government agencies do not always engage citizens in the development of their e-gov services or accept feedback. Customers identified the following barriers to government-to-customer e-governance: not everyone has Internet access, especially in rural or low-income areas, G2C technology can be problematic for citizens who lack computing skills. Some G2C sites have technology requirements (such as browser requirements and plug-ins) that won't allow access to certain services, language barriers, the necessity for an e-mail address to access certain services, and a lack of privacy.

== Government to employees ==
E-governance to employee partnership (G2E) Is one of four main primary interactions in the delivery model of E-governance. It is the relationship between online tools, sources, and articles that help employees to maintain the communication with the government and their own companies. E-governance relationship with employees allows new learning technology in one simple place as the computer. Documents can now be stored and shared with other colleagues online.

E-governance makes it possible for employees to become paperless and makes it easy for employees to send important documents back and forth to colleagues all over the world instead of having to print out these records or fax G2E services also include software for maintaining personal information and records of employees. Some of the benefits of G2E expansion include:

- E-payroll – maintaining the online sources to view paychecks, pay stubs, pay bills, and keep records for tax information.
- E-benefits – be able to look up what benefits an employee is receiving and what benefits they have a right to.
- E-training – allows for new and current employees to regularly maintain the training they have through the development of new technology and to allow new employees to train and learn over new materials in one convenient location. E-learning is another way to keep employees informed on the important materials they need to know through the use of visuals, animation, videos, etc. It is usually a computer-based learning tool, although not always. It is also a way for employees to learn at their own pace (distance learning), although it can be instructor-led.
- Maintaining records of personal information – Allows the system to keep all records in one easy location to update with every single bit of information that is relevant to a personal file. Examples being social security numbers, tax information, current address, and other information.

Government-to-employees (abbreviated G2E) is the online interactions through instantaneous communication tools between government units and their employees. G2E is one out of the four primary delivery models of e-government.

G2E is an effective way to provide e-learning to the employees, bring them together and to promote knowledge sharing among them. It also gives employees the possibility of accessing information in regard to compensation and benefits policies, training and learning opportunities and civil rights laws. G2E services also include software for maintaining personal information and records of employees.

G2E is adopted in many countries including the United States, Hong Kong, and New Zealand.

== Government to government ==
=== E-government ===
From the start of 1990s e-commerce and e-product, governments have incorporated digital technologies into administrative processes and public services. Governments have now tried to use their techniques to mitigate waste. E-government broadly refers to how the services and representation are now delivered and how they are now being implemented.

Many governments around the world have gradually turned to information technologies (IT) in an effort to keep up with today's demands. Historically, many governments in this sphere have only been reactive, but recently there has been a more proactive approach in developing comparable services such things as e-commerce and e-business.

Before, the structure emulated private-like business techniques. Recently that has all changed as e-government begins to make its own plan. Not only does e-government introduce a new form of record keeping, but it also continues to become more interactive to better the process of delivering services and promoting constituency participation.

Some experts suggest that the framework of such an organization is now expected to increase, with examples including paying utilities, tickets, and applying for permits. However, they point out that the biggest concern is accessibility to Internet technologies for the average citizen. Administrations are now trying to aid those who do not have the skills to fully participate in this new medium of governance.

An overhaul of the structure is now required as every pre-existing sub-entity must now merge under one concept of e-government. As a result, public policy has also seen changes due to the emerging of constituent participation and the Internet. Many governments such as Canada's have begun to invest in developing new mediums of communication of issues and information through virtual communication and participation. In practice, this has led to several responses and adaptations by interest groups, activist, and lobbying groups. This new medium has changed the way the polis interacts with government.

=== Editorial ===
The purpose to include e-governance to government is to means more efficient in various aspects. Whether it means to reduce cost by reducing paper clutter, staffing cost, or communicating with private citizens or public government. E-government brings many advantages to play such as facilitating information delivery, application process/renewal between both business and private citizen, and participation with the constituency. There are both internal and external advantages to the emergence of IT in government, though not all municipalities are alike in size and participation.

In theory, there are currently four major levels of e-government in municipal governments:

- The establishment of a secure and cooperative interaction among governmental agencies
- Web-based service delivery
- The application of e-commerce for more efficient government transactions activities
- Digital democracy

These, along with 5 degrees of technical integration and interaction of users include:

- Simple information dissemination (one-way communication)
- Two-way communication (request and response)
- Service and financial transactions
- Integration (horizontal and vertical integration)
- Political participation

The adoption of e-government in municipalities evokes greater innovation in e-governance by being specialized and localized. The level success and feedback depends greatly on the city size and government type. A council–manager government municipality typically works the best with this method, as opposed to mayor–council government positions, which tend to be more political. Therefore, they have greater barriers towards its application. Council-Manager governments are also more inclined to be effective here by bringing innovation and reinvention of governance to e-governance.

The International City/County Management Association and Public Technology Inc. have done surveys over the effectiveness of this method. The results are indicating that most governments are still in either the primary stages (stage 1 or 2), which revolves around public service requests. Though application of integration is now accelerating, there has been little to no instigating research to see its progression as e-governance to the government. We can only theorize it's still within the primitive stages of e-governance.

=== Overview ===
Government-to-government (abbreviated G2G) is the online non-commercial interaction between Government organizations, departments, and authorities and other Government organizations, departments, and authorities. Its use is common in the UK, along with G2C, the online non-commercial interaction of local and central Government and private individuals, and G2B the online non-commercial interaction of local and central Government and the commercial business sector.

G2G systems generally come in one of two types:

- Internal-facing – joining up a single Governments departments, agencies, organizations, and authorities. Examples include the integration aspect of the Government Gateway, and the UK NHS Connecting for Health Data SPINE.
- External facing – joining up multiple Governments IS systems. An example would include the integration aspect of the Schengen Information System (SIS), developed to meet the requirements of the Schengen Agreement.

=== Objective ===
The strategic objective of e-governance, or in this case G2G is to support and simplify governance for government, citizens, and businesses. The use of ICT can connect all parties and support processes and activities. Other objectives are to make government administration more transparent, speedy and accountable while addressing the society's needs and expectations through efficient public services and effective interaction between the people, businesses, and government.

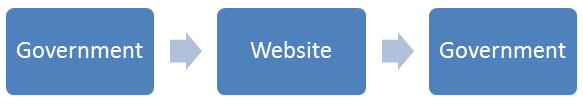
Government-to-government model

=== Delivery model ===
Within every of those interaction domains, four sorts of activities take place:

Pushing data over the internet, e.g.: regulative services, general holidays, public hearing schedules, issue briefs, notifications, etc. two-way communications between one governmental department and another, users will interact in dialogue with agencies and post issues, comments, or requests to the agency. Conducting transactions, e.g.: Lodging tax returns, applying for services and grants. Governance, e.g.: To alter the national transition from passive info access to individual participation by:

- Informing the individual
- Representing an individual
- Consulting an individual
- Involving the individual

=== Internal G2G (UK) ===
In the field of networking, the Government Secure Intranet (GSi) puts in place a secure link between central government departments. It is an IP-based virtual private network based on broadband technology introduced in April 1998 and further upgraded in February 2004. Among other things, it offers a variety of advanced services including file transfer and search facilities, directory services, email exchange facilities (both between network members and over the Internet) as well as voice and video services. An additional network is currently also under development: the Public Sector Network (PSN) will be the network to interconnect public authorities (including departments and agencies in England; devolved administrations and local governments) and facilitate in particular sharing of information and services among each other.

== Government to business ==
=== Objective ===
The objective of G2B is to reduce difficulties for business, provide immediate information and enable digital communication by e-business (XML). In addition, the government should re-use the data in the report proper, and take advantage of commercial electronic transaction protocol. Government services are concentrated on the following groups: human services; community services; judicial services; transport services; land resources; business services; financial services and other. Each of the components listed above for each cluster of related services to the enterprise.

=== Benefits for business ===
E-government reduces costs and lowers the barrier of allowing companies to interact with the government. The interaction between the government and businesses reduces the time required for businesses to conduct a transaction. For instance, there is no need to commute to a government agency's office, and transactions may be conducted online instantly with the click of a mouse. This significantly reduces transaction time for the government and businesses alike.

E-government provides a greater amount of information that the business needed, also it makes that information more clear. A key factor in business success is the ability to plan and forecast through data-driven future. The government collected a lot of economic, demographic and other trends in the data. This makes the data more accessible to companies which may increase the chance of economic prosperity.

In addition, e-government can help businesses navigate through government regulations by providing an intuitive site organization with a wealth of useful applications. The electronic filings of applications for environmental permits give an example of it. Companies often do not know how, when, and what they must apply. Therefore, failure to comply with environmental regulations up to 70%, a staggering figure most likely due to confusion about the requirements, rather than the product of willful disregard of the law.

=== Disadvantages ===
The government should concern that not all people are able to access the internet to gain online government services. The network reliability, as well as information on government bodies, can influence public opinion and prejudice hidden agenda. There are many considerations and implementation, designing e-government, including the potential impact of government and citizens of disintermediation, the impact on economic, social and political factors, vulnerable to cyber attacks, and disturbances to the status quo in these areas.

G2B rises the connection between government and businesses. Once the e-government began to develop, become more sophisticated, people will be forced to interact with e-government in the larger area. This may result in a lack of privacy for businesses as their government gets their more and more information. In the worst case, there is so much information in the electron transfer between the government and business, a system which is like totalitarian could be developed. As the government can access more information, the loss of privacy could be a cost.

The government site does not consider about "potential to reach many users including those who live in remote areas, are homebound, have low literacy levels, exist on poverty line incomes."

=== Examples ===
- e-Tender Box (ETB) system – ETB system was developed by Government Logistics Department (GLD) to replace Electronic Tendering System. Users can use the ETB system to download the resources and gain the service from the GLD.
- e-Procurement Programme – e-Procurement Programme provides a simple, convenient online ways for suppliers of the participating bureaux/departments (B/Ds) and suppliers of Government Logistics Department and agree to provide the low-valued goods and service. One of the last innovative examples is a public e-procurement system Prozorro.
- Finance and support for your business – UK Government provide the online financial help for business, including grants, loans, business guide; it also offers the funding for the sunrise businesses (just start) or small-scale firms.

=== Overview ===
The main goal of government to business is to increase productivity by giving business more access to information in a more organize manner while lowering the cost of doing business as well as the ability to cut "red tape", save time, reduce operational cost and to create a more transparent business environment when dealing with government.

- Lowering cost of doing business – electronic transaction save time compared to conducting business in person.
- Cutting red tape – rules and regulation placed upon business normally take time and are most likely to cause a delay – in (G2B) will allow a much faster process with fewer delays and decreasing the number of rules and regulations.
- Transparency – More information will be available, making G2B easier to communicate.

Government to business key points

1. Reduce the burden on business by adopting a process that enables collecting data once for multiple uses and streamlining redundant data.
2. Key lines of business: regulations, economic development, trade, permits and licenses, grants/loans, and asset management.

Difference between G2B and B2G

- Government to business (G2B) – Refers to the conducting of transactions between government bodies and business via the internet.
- Business to the government (B2G) – Professional affairs conducted between companies and regional, municipal, or federal governing bodies. B2G typically encompasses the determination and evaluation of proposal and completion of the contract.

Conclusion

The overall benefit of e-governance when dealing with business is that it enables the business to perform more efficiently.

== Challenges – International position ==
E-governance is facing numerous challenges world over. The traditional approach for introducing e-governance is just not sufficient due to the complexity from wide variety of application architecture mix from both legacy and modern worlds that need to be brought into the purview of e-governance. These challenges are arising from administrative, legal, institutional and technological factors. The challenge includes security drawbacks such as spoofing, tampering, repudiation, disclosure, elevation of privilege, denial of service and other cyber crimes. Other sets of problems include implementation parts such as funding, management of change, privacy, authentication, delivery of services, standardization, technology issues and use of local languages.

== See also ==
- E-governance in the United States
- E-learning
- Department for Business, Innovation and Skills
- Government by algorithm
- Open-source governance
