= Computer Jagat =

Bengali-language magazine published in Bangladesh

- Editor: Golap Munir
- Categories: ICT magazine
- Frequency: Monthly
- Founded: 1991
- Country: Bangladesh
- Language: Bengali
- Website: www.computerjagat.com.bd

Computer Jagat is an Information and Communication Technology (ICT) based Bengali-language magazine published monthly in Bangladesh since 1991. This is the first ICT magazine in Bangladesh founded by Professor Abdul Kader. The magazine holds an annual e-commerce fair, in 2015, it held the 7th e-commerce fair in Chittagong.

== History ==
Computer Jagat started journey with the slogan, Computers in every hand of the public to initiate its information and communication technology movement in Bangladesh in the 90s. Their mission was to create awareness of the positive effects of technologies in the public and help them get familiar with computers. They were the first to demonstrate the facilities of using Bangla language in computers with a cover article in 1992. They arranged the first programming contest in the country in September, 1992 the first computer and multimedia fair in Bangladesh on 28 December 1992. They initiated ‘The best ICT personality of the year’ and ‘The best product of the year’ award giving ceremony for the first time in Bangladesh to encourage the tech society in January, 1993. On 25 January 1996 they organized ‘Internet Week’ for the first time in Bangladesh. The magazine published cover articles in December, 2000 and October, 2005 on E-Governance that accelerated the government initiatives to implement E-Governance.
