= Visa requirements for Lithuanian citizens =

A Lithuanian passport

Visa requirements for Lithuanian citizens are administrative entry restrictions imposed on citizens of Lithuania by the authorities of other states.

As of 2026 Lithuanian citizens have visa-free or visa on arrival access to 180 countries and territories, ranking the Lithuanian passport 9th, tied with Iceland passport in terms of travel freedom according to the Henley Passport Index.

== Changes ==
Many countries began relaxing visa restrictions since Lithuanian independence in 1990 including Denmark (1 September 1992), Hungary (September 1992), Czechoslovakia (October 1992), Norway (March 1993), Poland (May 1993), Cyprus (July 1995), Malta (October 1995), Slovenia (May 1996), Bulgaria (December 1996) Iceland (April 1997), Finland (2 November 1997), Switzerland (January 1998), Austria (February 1999), Germany (March 1999), Greece (March 1999), France (March 1999) Chile (May 1999) Portugal (August 1999) Belgium, Luxembourg and Netherlands (November 1999) Spain (April 2000), Uruguay (May 2000), Japan (May 2000) and Israel (June 2000). Following countries have restored visa for Lithuanian citizens: Kazakhstan (22 October 1993, was resumed in 2017), Moldova (1 November 1993, was resumed in 2006), Russia (19 April 1994) Since Lithuanian 2004 accession to the European Union (EU), visa restrictions for Lithuanian citizens were relaxed. Following the accession to the European Union in 2004 and the Schengen Area in 2008, visa requirements were lifted by many countries including Macau (February 2002), Hong Kong (February 2002), Slovakia (March 2002), South Korea (April 2002), Albania (May 2003), Serbia and Montenegro (May 2003), Argentina (December 2003) Panama (February 2004) Ukraine (July 2004), Costa Rica (November 2004), Mauritius (November 2004), New Zealand (April 2005), Paraguay (April 2005), Georgia (June 2005), Moldova (7 July 2005), North Macedonia (July 2005), Bosnia and Herzegovina (July 2005), Brunei (1 October 2006), Canada (March 2008), Antigua and Barbuda (2008), Taiwan (November 2008), United States (November 2008), Brazil (January 2009) and Turkey (November 2009).

Recently visa requirements for Lithuanian citizens were also lifted by Kyrgyzstan (July 2012), Armenia (January 2013), the United Arab Emirates, Timor-Leste, Samoa (May 2015), São Tomé and Príncipe (August 2015), Indonesia (October 2015), Tonga (November 2015), Palau (December 2015), Marshall Islands (June 2016), Tuvalu (July 2016), Solomon Islands (October 2016), Kazakhstan (January 2017), Belarus (February 2017), Qatar (August 2017), Cape Verde (1 January 2019), Uzbekistan (February 2019), Thailand (April 2019), Tajikistan (January 2022), Zambia (November 2022), Mongolia (January 2023), Angola (September 2023), Kenya (January 2024) and South Africa.

Lithuanian citizens were made eligible for eVisas recently by Russia (August 2023), Cameroon (May 2023), Guinea and Malawi (October 2019), Saudi Arabia (September 2019), Suriname and Pakistan (April 2019), Vietnam (February 2019), Tanzania and Papua New Guinea (November 2018), Uzbekistan (1 July 2018), Ethiopia (1 June 2018), Djibouti (February 2018), Egypt (December 2017), Azerbaijan (January 2017), India (May 2015) and Myanmar (October 2014).

In 2023, Lithuania ranked 9th on the list of countries based on the visa requirements for their citizens. This means that Lithuanians can travel to 182 countries and territories visa-free or can obtain visa on arrival. In 2009 Lithuanian citizens could travel to 125 countries without a visa, to 140 in 2010, and 149 in 2012.

== Visa requirements map ==
Visa requirements for Lithuanian citizens Lithuania Freedom of movement Visa free Visa issued upon arrival eVisa Visa available both on arrival or online Visa required prior to arrival

== Visa requirements ==
| Country | Visa requirement | Allowed stay | Notes (excluding departure fees) |
|---|---|---|---|
| Afghanistan | eVisa | 30 days | Visa is not required in case born in Afghanistan or can proof that one of their parents is a national of Afghanistan or born in Afghanistan.; e-Visa : Visitors must arrive at Kabul International (KBL). |
| Albania | Visa not required | 90 days | ID card valid |
| Algeria | Visa required | | |
| Andorra | Visa not required | | ID card valid |
| Angola | Visa not required | 30 days | 30 days within any 90 day period |
| Antigua and Barbuda | Visa not required | 6 months | |
| Argentina | Visa not required | 90 days | |
| Armenia | Visa not required | 180 days | |
| Australia | eVisitor | 90 days | 90 days on each visit in 12-month period if granted |
| Austria | Visa not required | Freedom of movement; ID card valid | |
| Azerbaijan | eVisa | 30 days | |
| Bahamas | Visa not required | 3 months | |
| Bahrain | eVisa / Visa on arrival | 14 days | Visa is also obtainable online. |
| Bangladesh | Visa on arrival | 30 days | |
| Barbados | Visa not required | 3 months | |
| Belarus | Visa not required | 30 days | 90 days visa free if they use land border crossings |
| Belgium | Visa not required | Freedom of movement; ID card valid | |
| Belize | Visa not required | | |
| Benin | eVisa | 30 days / 90 days | Must have an international vaccination certificate. |
| Bhutan | eVisa | | |
| Bolivia | Visa not required | 90 days | |
| Bosnia and Herzegovina | Visa not required | 90 days | 90 days within any 6-month period; ID card valid |
| Botswana | Visa not required | 90 days | |
| Brazil | Visa not required | 90 days | 90 days within any 180 day period |
| Brunei | Visa not required | 90 days | |
| Bulgaria | Visa not required | Freedom of movement; ID card valid | |
| Burkina Faso | eVisa | 30 days | |
| Burundi | eVisa / Visa on arrival | 30 days | |
| Cambodia | eVisa / Visa on arrival | 30 days | Visa is also obtainable online. |
| Cameroon | eVisa | 1 months | Pre-approved visa can be picked up on arrival. |
| Canada | eTA / Visa not required | 6 months | eTA required if arriving by air. |
| Cape Verde | Visa not required | 30 days | Must register online at least five days prior to arrival. |
| Central African Republic | Visa required | | |
| Chad | eVisa | | |
| Chile | Visa not required | 90 days | |
| China | Visa required | | 240-hour (10-day) visa-free transit to a third country or region (including Hong Kong, Macau or Taiwan) using any mode of transport. Must have a confirmed onward ticket/itinerary, and enter through 1 of 64 approved ports.; During which, may freely travel within the 24 provinces permitted for visa-free transit and engage in tourism, business, and visits.; 24-hour visa-free transit to a third country or region (including Hong Kong, Macau, and Taiwan), is available at most international airports, without leaving the airport.; Travellers who need to leave the airport may obtain a temporary entry permit from immigration.; 5-day port visa (Visa on Arrival) for Shenzhen if arriving at designated ports of entry from Hong Kong by land or sea, for stays within Shenzhen.; 3-day port visa (Visa on Arrival) if arriving in Zhuhai or Xiamen at designated ports of entry, for stays within the respective city.; 15-day visa-free entry for cruise ship passengers in tour groups, if arriving at any cruise port along China's coastline, including but not limited to Tianjin; Dalian; Shanghai; Lianyungang; Wenzhou; Zhoushan; Xiamen; Qingdao; Guangzhou; Shenzhen; Beihai; Haikou; Sanya. May further travel inland to all regions of coastal provinces (and equivalents) and Beijing.; May apply for a port visa (Visa on Arrival) if travelling for an urgent, qualified reason. Prior clearance for port visa is highly recommended or may be denied boarding by airlines. |
| Colombia | Visa not required | 180 days | 90 days – extendable up to 180-days stay within a one-year period |
| Comoros | Visa on arrival | | |
| Republic of the Congo | Visa required | | |
| Democratic Republic of the Congo | eVisa | 7 days | |
| Costa Rica | Visa not required | 90 days | |
| Côte d'Ivoire | eVisa | 30 days | |
| Croatia | Visa not required | Freedom of movement; ID card valid | |
| Cuba | eVisa | 90 days | |
| Cyprus | Visa not required | Freedom of movement; ID card valid | |
| Czech Republic | Visa not required | Freedom of movement; ID card valid | |
| Denmark | Visa not required | Freedom of movement (DK); ID card valid | |
| Djibouti | eVisa | 31 days | |
| Dominica | Visa not required | 90 days | 90 days within any 180 day period |
| Dominican Republic | Visa not required | 90 days | |
| Ecuador | Visa not required | 90 days | |
| Egypt | eVisa / Visa on arrival | 30 days | |
| El Salvador | Visa not required | 6 months | |
| Equatorial Guinea | eVisa | | |
| Eritrea | Visa required | | Pre-approved visa can be picked up on arrival. |
| Estonia | Visa not required | Freedom of movement; ID card valid | |
| Eswatini | Visa not required | 30 days | |
| Ethiopia | eVisa / Visa on arrival | 3 months | Visa on arrival issued only in Addis Ababa Bole International Airport |
| Fiji | Visa not required | 4 months | |
| Finland | Visa not required | Freedom of movement; ID card valid | |
| France | Visa not required | Freedom of movement (in Regions of France); ID card valid | |
| Gabon | eVisa | 90 days | Electronic visa holders must arrive via Libreville International Airport. |
| Gambia | Visa not required | 28 days | |
| Georgia | Visa not required | 1 year | ID card valid |
| Germany | Visa not required | Freedom of movement; ID card valid | |
| Ghana | Visa required | | |
| Greece | Visa not required | Freedom of movement; ID card valid | |
| Grenada | Visa not required | 3 months | |
| Guatemala | Visa not required | 90 days | |
| Guinea | eVisa | 90 days | |
| Guinea-Bissau | eVisa / Visa on arrival | 90 days | |
| Guyana | eVisa | | |
| Haiti | Visa not required | 90 days | |
| Honduras | Visa not required | 3 months | |
| Hungary | Visa not required | Freedom of movement; ID card valid | |
| Iceland | Visa not required | Freedom of movement; ID card valid | |
| India | e-Visa | 60 days | e-Visa holders must arrive via 32 designated airports (Note: Ahmedabad; Amritsar; Bagdogra; Bengaluru; Bhubaneswar; Chandigarh; Chennai; Coimbatore; Delhi; Gaya; Goa-Dabolim; Goa-Manohar; Guwahati; Hyderabad; Indore; Jaipur; Kannur; Kochi; Kolkata; Kozhikode; Lucknow; Madurai; Mangaluru; Mumbai; Nagpur; Port Blair; Pune; Surat; Thiruvananthapuram; Tiruchirappalli; Varanasi; Visakhapatnam) or 5 designated seaports. (Note: Chennai; Cochin; Mormugao (Goa); Mumbai; Mangalore); An Indian e-Tourist Visa may only be obtained twice within 1 calendar year.; Foreigners of Pakistani origin or who hold a Pakistani Passport are not eligible for an e-Visa. Foreigners who are not Pakistani nationals, but whose parents or grandparents (either paternal or maternal) were born in, or were permanent residents in Pakistan, are also not eligible for an e-Visa. |
| Indonesia | eVisa / Visa on arrival | 30 days | Not available at all entry points. |
| Iran | eVisa | 30 days | |
| Iraq | eVisa | 60 days | |
| Ireland | Visa not required | Freedom of movement; ID card valid | |
| Israel | Electronic Travel Authorization | 3 months | |
| Italy | Visa not required | Freedom of movement; ID card valid | |
| Jamaica | Visa not required | 30 days | For tourism |
| Japan | Visa not required | 90 days | Can be extended for another 90 days. |
| Jordan | eVisa / Visa on arrival | 30 days | Conditions apply |
| Kazakhstan | Visa not required | 30 days | |
| Kenya | Electronic Travel Authorization | 90 days | |
| Kiribati | Visa not required | 90 days | 90 days within any 180 day period |
| North Korea | Visa required | | |
| South Korea | Visa not required | 90 days | |
| Kuwait | eVisa / Visa on arrival | 3 months | |
| Kyrgyzstan | Visa not required | 60 days | |
| Laos | eVisa / Visa on arrival | 30 days | 18 (Note: Savannakhet Airport; Lanetoui - Mengkang (China); Meuangmom - Wan Pong (Myanmar); Banvang - Ban Khok Phai (Thailand); Namngeun - Huay Kon (Thailand); Paksan - Bueng Kan (Thailand); Paktaphan - Pak Saeng (Thailand); Pangmon - Ban Huak (Thailand); Phoudou (Thailand); Dak ta ock - Nam Giang (Vietnam); La Lai (Vietnam); Namkan (Vietnam); Namphao - Cau Treo (Vietnam); Namsoy - Na Meo (Vietnam); Naphao - Cha Lo (Vietnam); Pahang - Long Sap (Vietnam); Panghok - Tây Trang (Vietnam); Phoukeua - Bo Y (Vietnam)) of the 33 border crossings are only open to regular visa holders.; e-Visa may be used to enter Laos through the Luang Prabang, Pakse and Vientiane international airports, 3 Thai-Lao Friendship Bridges (Note: Vientiane (Friendship Bridge 1); Savannakhet (Friendship Bridge 2); Bokeo (Friendship Bridge 4)), in Boten (road and railroad), and in Vientiane (at Khamsavath railway station).; Visa on arrival is available at the Luang Prabang, Pakse and Vientiane international airports, 4 Thai-Lao Friendship Bridges (Note: Vientiane (Friendship Bridge 1); Savannakhet (Friendship Bridge 2); Khammouane (Friendship Bridge 3); Bokeo (Friendship Bridge 4)) and 7 border crossings. (Note: Nongnokkheane - Trapeang Kriel (Cambodia); Boten - Bo han (China); Golden Triangle/Samliemkham (Thailand); Khamsavath railway station (Thailand); Namheuang - Ban Na Kraseng (Thailand); Vang tao - Chongmek (Thailand); Dansavan - Lao Bảo (Vietnam)) |
| Latvia | Visa not required | Freedom of movement; ID card valid | |
| Lebanon | Visa on arrival | 1 month | Extendable for 2 additional months; Granted free of charge at Beirut International Airport or any other port of entry if there is no Israeli visa or seal, holding a telephone number, an address in Lebanon, and a non refundable return or circle trip ticket. |
| Lesotho | eVisa | | |
| Liberia | eVisa | | |
| Libya | eVisa | | |
| Liechtenstein | Visa not required | Freedom of movement; ID card valid | |
| Luxembourg | Visa not required | Freedom of movement; ID card valid | |
| North Macedonia | Visa not required | 90 days | ID card valid |
| Madagascar | eVisa / Visa on arrival | 90 days | |
| Malawi | eVisa / Visa on arrival | 30 days | |
| Malaysia | Visa not required | 90 days | |
| Maldives | Visa on arrival | 30 days | |
| Mali | Visa required | | |
| Malta | Visa not required | Freedom of movement; ID card valid | |
| Marshall Islands | Visa not required | 90 days | 90 days within any 180 day period |
| Mauritania | eVisa | | Available at Nouakchott–Oumtounsy International Airport. |
| Mauritius | Visa not required | 90 days | |
| Mexico | Visa not required | 180 days | |
| Micronesia | Visa not required | 90 days | 90 days within any 180 day period |
| Moldova | Visa not required | 90 days | 90 days within any 180 day period |
| Monaco | Visa not required | | ID card valid |
| Mongolia | Visa not required | 30 days | |
| Montenegro | Visa not required | 90 days | ID card valid for 30 days |
| Morocco | Visa not required | 90 days | |
| Mozambique | eVisa/Visa on arrival | 30 days | |
| Myanmar | eVisa | 28 days | eVisa holders must arrive via Yangon, Nay Pyi Taw or Mandalay airports or via land border crossings with Thailand — Tachileik, Myawaddy and Kawthaung or India — Rih Khaw Dar and Tamu.; eVisa available for both tourism (allowed stay is 28 days) or business (allowed stay is 70 days) purposes. |
| Namibia | e-VOA | 90 days | |
| Nauru | Visa required | | |
| Nepal | eVisa/Visa on arrival | 90 days | |
| Netherlands | Visa not required | Freedom of movement (European Netherlands); ID card valid | |
| New Zealand | Electronic Travel Authority | 3 months | Holders of a Lithuanian non-citizen passport require a visa.; Diplomatic, service and standard passports with the former USSR symbol issued in Lithuania are unacceptable, and visas will not be endorsed in them.; International Visitor Conservation and Tourism Levy must be paid upon requesting an Electronic Travel Authority.; Holders of an Australian Permanent Resident Visa or Resident Return Visa may be granted a New Zealand Resident Visa on arrival permitting indefinite stay (pursuant to the Trans-Tasman Travel Arrangement), subject to meeting character requirements and obtaining an Electronic Travel Authority prior to departure. Such travellers are not required to pay the International Visitor Conservation and Tourism Levy. |
| Nicaragua | eVisa | | |
| Niger | Visa required | | |
| Nigeria | eVisa | 90 days | |
| Norway | Visa not required | Freedom of movement; ID card valid | |
| Oman | visa not required | 14 days | 30 days e-visa also available |
| Pakistan | eVisa | 90 days | Issued free of charge. |
| Palau | Visa not required | 90 days | 90 days within any 180 day period |
| Panama | Visa not required | 180 days | |
| Papua New Guinea | eVisa | 60 days | |
| Paraguay | Visa not required | 90 days | |
| Peru | Visa not required | 90 days | 90 days within any 6-month period |
| Philippines | Visa not required | 30 days | |
| Poland | Visa not required | Freedom of movement; ID card valid | |
| Portugal | Visa not required | Freedom of movement; ID card valid | |
| Qatar | Visa not required | 90 days | |
| Romania | Visa not required | Freedom of movement; ID card valid | |
| Russia | eVisa | 30 days | |
| Rwanda | eVisa / Visa on arrival | 30 days | |
| Saint Kitts and Nevis | Visa not required | 3 months | |
| Saint Lucia | Visa not required | 90 days | 90 days within any 180 day period |
| Saint Vincent and the Grenadines | Visa not required | 90 days | 90 days within any 180 day period |
| Samoa | Visa not required | 90 days | 90 days within any 180 day period |
| San Marino | Visa not required | | ID card valid |
| São Tomé and Príncipe | Visa not required | 15 days | |
| Saudi Arabia | eVisa / Visa on arrival | 90 days | |
| Senegal | Visa not required | 90 days | |
| Serbia | Visa not required | 90 days | 90 days within any 6-month period; ID card valid |
| Seychelles | Visa not required | 3 months | |
| Sierra Leone | eVisa / Visa on arrival | 3 months / 30 days | |
| Singapore | Visa not required | 90 days | |
| Slovakia | Visa not required | Freedom of movement; ID card valid | |
| Slovenia | Visa not required | Freedom of movement; ID card valid | |
| Solomon Islands | Visa not required | 90 days | 90 days within any 180 day period |
| Somalia | eVisa | | Available at Berbera, Borama, Burao, Erigavo and Hargeisa airports.; 30 days, available at Bosaso Airport, Galcaio Airport and Mogadishu Airport. |
| South Africa | Visa not required | 90 days | |
| South Sudan | eVisa | | Obtainable online; Printed visa authorization must be presented at the time of travel |
| Spain | Visa not required | Freedom of movement; ID card valid | |
| Sri Lanka | ETA / Visa on arrival | 30 days | |
| Sudan | Visa required | | |
| Suriname | E-tourist card | 90 days | Multiple entry eVisa is also available. |
| Sweden | Visa not required | Freedom of movement; ID card valid | |
| Switzerland | Visa not required | Freedom of movement; ID card valid | |
| Syria | eVisa | | |
| Tajikistan | Visa not required | 30 days | |
| Tanzania | eVisa / Visa on arrival | 3 months | |
| Thailand | Visa not required | 60 days | |
| Timor-Leste | Visa not required | 90 days | 90 days within any 180 day period |
| Togo | eVisa | 15 days | |
| Tonga | Visa not required | 90 days | 90 days within any 180 day period |
| Trinidad and Tobago | Visa not required | 90 days | 90 days within any 180 day period |
| Tunisia | Visa not required | 3 months | ID card valid on organized tours |
| Turkey | Visa not required | 3 months | |
| Turkmenistan | Visa required | | |
| Tuvalu | Visa not required | 90 days | 90 days within any 180 day period |
| Uganda | eVisa / Visa on arrival | | May apply online. |
| Ukraine | Visa not required | 90 days | 90 days within any 180 day period |
| United Arab Emirates | Visa not required | 90 days | 90 days within any 180 day period |
| United Kingdom | Electronic Travel Authorisation | 6 months | |
| United States | Visa Waiver Program | 90 days | On arrival from overseas; ESTA (valid for 2 years when issued) required if arriving by air or cruise ship. |
| Uruguay | Visa not required | 90 days | |
| Uzbekistan | Visa not required | 30 days | |
| Vanuatu | Visa not required | 90 days | 90 days within any 180 day period |
| Vatican City | Visa not required | | ID card valid |
| Venezuela | Visa not required | 90 days | |
| Vietnam | eVisa | 90 days | Phú Quốc without a visa for up to 30 days. |
| Yemen | Visa required | | |
| Zambia | Visa not required | 90 days | |
| Zimbabwe | eVisa / Visa on arrival | 3 months | |

== Territories and disputed areas ==
Visa requirements for Lithuanian citizens for visits to various territories, disputed areas and restricted zones:

Europe

- Abkhazia — Visa required.
- Mount Athos — Special permit required (4 days: 25 euro for Orthodox visitors, 35 euro for non-Orthodox visitors, 18 euro for students). There is a visitors' quota: maximum 100 Orthodox and 10 non-Orthodox per day and women are not allowed. ID card valid.
- (Belarus) Brest and Grodno — Visa not required for 10 days.
- (Autonomous Republic of Crimea) Crimea — Visa issued by Russia is required.
- Turkish Republic of Northern Cyprus — Visa free access for 3 months. Passport or ID card is required.
- (United Nations) UN Buffer Zone in Cyprus — Access Permit is required for travelling inside the zone, except Civil Use Areas.
- Gibraltar — Freedom of movement. ID card valid.
- (Norway) Jan Mayen — permit issued by the local police required for staying for less than 24 hours and permit issued by the Norwegian police for staying for more than 24 hours.
- Svalbard of Norway — Visa not Required (Unlimited Stay under Svalbard Treaty).
- Kosovo — visa free for 90 days. ID card valid.
- South Ossetia — Visa free. Multiple entry visa to Russia and three-day prior notification are required to enter South Ossetia.
- Transnistria — Visa free. Registration required after 24h.

Africa

- British Indian Ocean Territory — special permit required.
- Eritrea (outside Asmara) — visa covers Asmara only; to travel in the rest of the country, a Travel Permit for Foreigners is required (20 Eritrean nakfa).
- Saint Helena, Ascension and Tristan da Cunha
  - Ascension Island — eVisa for 3 months within any year period.
  - Saint Helena — Visitor's Pass granted on arrival valid for 4/10/21/60/90 days for 12/14/16/20/25 pound sterling.
  - Tristan da Cunha — Permission to land required for 15/30 pounds sterling (yacht/ship passenger) for Tristan da Cunha Island or 20 pounds sterling for Gough Island, Inaccessible Island or Nightingale Islands.
- Reunion — Unlimited Stay
- Sahrawi Arab Democratic Republic (Western Sahara controlled territory) — undefined visa regime.
- Somaliland — visa required (30 days for 30 US dollars, payable on arrival).

Asia

- Hong Kong — Visa not required for 90 days.
- India — Protected Area Permit (PAP) required for all of Arunachal Pradesh, Manipur, Mizoram and parts of Himachal Pradesh, Jammu and Kashmir and Uttarakhand. Restricted Area Permit (RAP) required for all of Andaman and Nicobar Islands and Lakshadweep and parts of Sikkim. Some of these requirements are occasionally lifted for a year.
- Macao — Visa not required for 90 days.
- North Korea outside Pyongyang – People are not allowed to leave the capital city, tourists can only leave the capital with a governmental tourist guide (no independent moving)
- Palestine – Visa not required. Arrival by sea to Gaza Strip not allowed.
- Taiwan — Visa not required for 90 days.
- (Tajikistan) Gorno-Badakhshan Autonomous Province — OIVR permit required (15+5 Tajikistani Somoni) and another special permit (free of charge) is required for Lake Sarez.
- (China) Tibet Autonomous Region — Tibet Travel Permit required (10 US Dollars).
- (United Nations) Korean Demilitarized Zone — restricted zone.
- (United Nations) UNDOF Zone and Ghajar — restricted zones.

Caribbean and North Atlantic

- Anguilla — Visa not required for 3 months.
- Aruba — Visa not required for 30 days.
- Bermuda — Visa not required.
- (Netherlands) Bonaire, St. Eustatius and Saba — Visa not required for 3 months.
- British Virgin Islands — Visa not required.
- Cayman Islands — Visa not required for 6 months.
- Curaçao — Visa not required for 3 months.
- Montserrat — Visa not required for 6 months.
- Puerto Rico — Visa not required under the Visa Waiver Program, for 90 days on arrival from overseas for 2 years. ESTA required.
- Sint Maarten — Visa not required for 3 months.
- Turks and Caicos Islands — Visa not required for 30 days.
- U.S. Virgin Islands — Visa not required under the Visa Waiver Program, for 90 days on arrival from overseas for 2 years. ESTA required.

Oceania

- American Samoa — Electronic authorization for 30 days.
- (Australia) Ashmore and Cartier Islands — special authorisation required.
- (France) Clipperton Island — special permit required.
- Cook Islands — Visa free access for 31 days.
- Guam — Visa not required under the Visa Waiver Program, for 90 days on arrival from overseas for 2 years. ESTA required.
- Niue — Visa on arrival valid for 30 days is issued free of charge.
- Pitcairn Islands — 14 days visa free and landing fee US$35 or tax of US$5 if not going ashore.
- Tokelau — Entry permit required.
- United States Minor Outlying Islands — special permits required for Baker Island, Howland Island, Jarvis Island, Johnston Atoll, Kingman Reef, Midway Atoll, Palmyra Atoll and Wake Island.

South Atlantic and Antarctica

- Falkland Islands — Visitor Permit valid for 4 weeks is issued on arrival.
- South Georgia and the South Sandwich Islands — Pre-arrival permit from the Commissioner required (72 hours/1 month for 110/160 pounds sterling).
- Antarctica and adjacent islands — special permits required for British Antarctic Territory, French Southern and Antarctic Lands, Argentine Antarctica, (Australia) Australian Antarctic Territory, (Antártica Chilena Province) Chilean Antarctic Territory, (Australia) Heard Island and McDonald Islands, (Norway) Peter I Island, (Norway) Queen Maud Land, (New Zealand) Ross Dependency.

== Non-ordinary passports ==
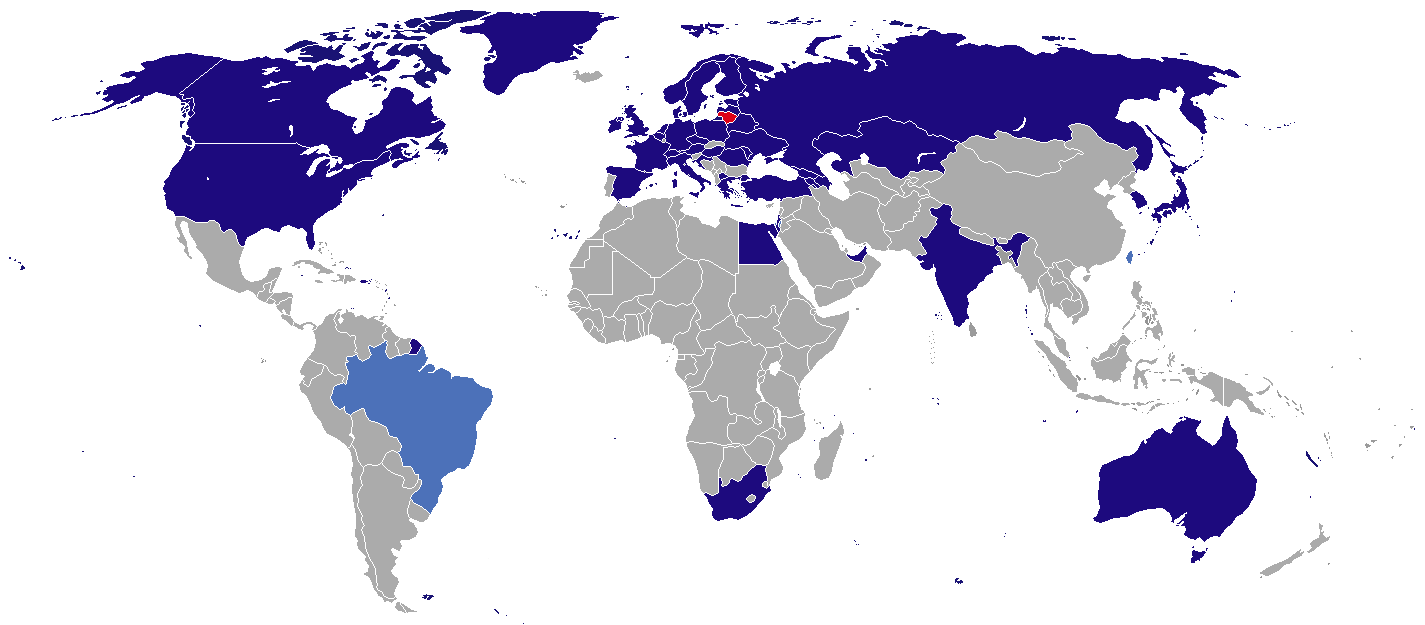
Countries with Lithuanian diplomatic missions

Holders of various categories of official Lithuanian passports have additional visa-free access to the following countries – Azerbaijan (diplomatic passports), China (diplomatic or service passports), Kazakhstan (diplomatic passports) and Russia (diplomatic passports). Holders of diplomatic or service passports of any country have visa-free access to Cape Verde, Ethiopia, Mali and Zimbabwe.

== Non-visa restrictions ==
=== Blank passport pages ===
Many countries require a minimum number of blank pages to be available in the passport being presented, typically one or two pages. Endorsement pages, which often appear after the visa pages, are not counted as being valid or available.

=== Vaccination ===
Cover of the new International Certificate of Vaccination issued by the Bureau of Quarantine in the Philippines since 2021

The African countries of Angola, Benin, Burkina Faso, Burundi, Cameroon, Central African Republic, Democratic Republic of the Congo, Republic of the Congo, Côte d'Ivoire, Gabon, Ghana, Guinea-Bissau, Mali, Niger, Sierra Leone and Togo, South Sudan and Uganda, along with French Guiana in South America, require all incoming passengers older than nine months to one year, to have a current International Certificate of Vaccination or Prophylaxis.

Some other countries require vaccination only if the passenger is coming from an infected area or has visited one recently or has transited for 12 hours in those countries: Algeria, Botswana, Cabo Verde, Chad, Djibouti, Egypt, Eswatini, Ethiopia, Gambia, Ghana, Guinea, Lesotho, Libya, Equatorial Guinea, Eritrea, Madagascar, Malawi, Mauritania, Mauritius, Mozambique, Namibia, Nigeria, Papua New Guinea, Seychelles, Somalia, South Africa, Sudan, Tunisia, Uganda, Tanzania, Zambia and Zimbabwe.

=== Passport validity length ===
Very few countries, such as Paraguay, just require a valid passport on arrival.

However many countries and groupings now require only an identity card – especially from their neighbours. Other countries may have special bilateral arrangements that depart from the generality of their passport validity length policies to shorten the period of passport validity required for each other's citizens or even accept passports that have already expired (but not been cancelled).

Some countries, such as Japan, Ireland and the United Kingdom, require a passport valid throughout the period of the intended stay.

In the absence of specific bilateral agreements, countries requiring passports to be valid for at least 6 more months on arrival include Afghanistan, Algeria, Anguilla, Bahrain, Bhutan, Botswana, British Virgin Islands, Brunei, Cambodia, Cameroon, Cape Verde, Cayman Islands, Central African Republic, Chad, Comoros, Costa Rica, Côte d'Ivoire, Curaçao, Ecuador, Egypt, El Salvador, Equatorial Guinea, Fiji, Gabon, Guinea Bissau, Guyana, Haiti, India, Indonesia, Iran, Iraq, Israel, Jordan, Kenya, Kiribati, Kuwait, Laos, Madagascar, Malaysia, Marshall Islands, Mongolia, Myanmar, Namibia, Nepal, Nicaragua, Nigeria, Oman, Palau, Papua New Guinea, Peru, Philippines, Qatar, Rwanda, Samoa, Saudi Arabia, Singapore, Solomon Islands, Somalia, Sri Lanka, Sudan, Suriname, Tanzania, Thailand, Timor-Leste, Tokelau, Tonga, Turkey, Tuvalu, Uganda, United Arab Emirates, Vanuatu, Venezuela, and Vietnam.

Countries requiring passports valid for at least 4 months on arrival include Micronesia and Zambia.

Countries requiring passports with a validity of at least 3 months beyond the date of intended departure include Azerbaijan, Bosnia and Herzegovina, Honduras, Montenegro, Nauru, Moldova and New Zealand. Similarly, the EEA countries of Iceland, Liechtenstein, Norway, all European Union countries (except Ireland) together with Switzerland also require 3 months validity beyond the date of the bearer's intended departure unless the bearer is an EEA or Swiss national.

Countries requiring passports valid for at least 3 months on arrival include Albania, North Macedonia, Panama, and Senegal.

Bermuda requires passports to be valid for at least 45 days upon entry.

Countries that require a passport validity of at least one month beyond the date of intended departure include Eritrea, Hong Kong, Lebanon, Macau, the Maldives and South Africa.

==== Maximum passport age ====
Countries of the Schengen area require non-EU passports to be less than 10 years old upon entry.

=== Criminal record ===
Some countries, including Australia, Canada, Fiji, New Zealand and the United States, routinely deny entry to non-citizens who have a criminal record, while others impose restrictions depending on the type of conviction and the length of the sentence.

=== Persona non grata ===
The government of a country can declare a diplomat persona non grata, banning them from entering the country or expelling them if they have already entered. In non-diplomatic use, the authorities of a country may also declare a foreigner persona non grata permanently or temporarily, usually because of unlawful activity.

=== Israeli stamps ===
Kuwait, Lebanon, Libya, and Yemen do not allow entry to people with passport stamps from Israel or whose passports have either a used or an unused Israeli visa, or where there is evidence of previous travel to Israel such as entry or exit stamps from neighbouring border posts in transit countries such as Jordan and Egypt.

To circumvent this Arab League boycott of Israel, the Israeli immigration services have now mostly ceased to stamp foreign nationals' passports on either entry to or exit from Israel (unless the entry is for some work-related purposes). Since 15 January 2013, Israel no longer stamps foreign passports at Ben Gurion Airport. Passports are still (as of 22 June 2017) stamped at Erez when passing into and out of Gaza.

Iran refuses admission to holders of passports containing an Israeli visa or stamp that is less than 12 months old.

=== Biometrics ===
Several countries mandate that all travellers, or all foreign travellers, be fingerprinted on arrival and will refuse admission to or even arrest travellers who refuse to comply. In some countries, such as the United States, this may apply even to transit passengers who merely wish to change planes rather than go landside.

Fingerprinting countries/regions include Afghanistan, Argentina, Brunei, Cambodia, China, Ethiopia, Ghana, Guinea, India, Japan, Kenya (both fingerprints and a photo are taken), Malaysia upon entry and departure, Mongolia, Saudi Arabia, the Schengen Area, Singapore, South Korea, Taiwan, Thailand, Uganda, the United Arab Emirates and the United States.

Many countries also require a photo be taken of people entering the country. The United States, which does not fully implement exit control formalities at its land frontiers (although long mandated by its own legislation), intends to implement facial recognition for passengers departing from international airports to identify people who overstay their visa.

Together with fingerprint and face recognition, iris scanning is one of three biometric identification technologies internationally standardised since 2006 by the International Civil Aviation Organization (ICAO) for use in e-passports and the United Arab Emirates conducts iris scanning on visitors who need to apply for a visa. The United States Department of Homeland Security has announced plans to greatly increase the biometric data it collects at US borders. In 2018, Singapore began trials of iris scanning at three land and maritime immigration checkpoints.

== Right to consular protection in non-EU countries ==
When in a non-EU country where there is no Lithuanian embassy, Lithuanian citizens as EU citizens have the right to get consular protection from the embassy of any other EU country present in that country.

See also List of diplomatic missions of Lithuania.

== See also ==
- Visa requirements for the European Union citizens
- Lithuanian passport
- Visa policy in the European Union

== Notes and references ==
Notes
