= Lithuanian passport =

Passport of the Republic of Lithuania issued to Lithuanian citizens

- The front cover of a contemporary Lithuanian biometric passport
- Type: Passport
- Issued by: Lithuania
- First issued: 1919 (first version); 2 January 2008 (biometric); 22 May 2019 (current version)
- Purpose: Identification
- Eligibility: Lithuanian citizenship
- Expiration: 10 years after issuance (adults); 5 years (children aged 5-16); 2 years (children under 5)
- Cost: €50 adults; €25 children

Lithuanian passport (Lithuanian: Lietuvos piliečio pasas) is an official document, issued to Lithuanian citizens to identify themselves as such and/or to facilitate travel outside Lithuania (there are other types of passports which may be issued by Lithuanian authorities to non-citizens; e.g. a "Foreigner's Passport", or "Stateless Person's Passport", or "Refugee's Passport"). Every Lithuanian citizen is also a citizen of the European Union. The Lithuanian passport, along with the national identity card allows for free rights of movement and residence in any of the states of the European Union, European Economic Area and Switzerland.

The passport-book contains 32 pages and a polycarbonate personal data page; personal data, a photograph, and signature are laser engraved. The passport is manufactured according to International Civil Aviation Organization (ICAO) requirements. All data "brackets" could be read in Lithuanian, English, and French. The passports are issued to Lithuanian citizens upon request, and are valid for up to ten years (for adults) and five years for children (aged between 5–16). For younger children, passports are valid for two years, which can be extended by a separate request for up to five years.

Since 28 August 2006, the Lithuanian passports have become e-passports (i.e. they include electronic biometric data), whereas beginning with 1 January 2008, the Lithuanian passport is issued in a new format (the most notable feature of it is the burgundy colour and the words "European Union" [spelled in Lithuanian] featured on its cover). As with all e-passports, RFID memory chip stores the photograph and other data (such as fingerprint) in electronic form and could be read by border agencies abroad from a distance of a few feet. In 2019 the passport was updated again with new internal features. The new passport is designed to comply with the EU requirements and the International Civil Aviation Organization (ICAO) recommendations. The passport contains 32 numbered pages plus a polycarbonate personal identification page with data, photo and signature engraved by laser engravers.

== Physical appearance ==
In conformity with the standard European Union design, Lithuanian passports are burgundy, with the Lithuanian coat of arms embedded in the centre of the front cover. The words "Europos Sąjunga" (English: European Union) and "Lietuvos Respublika" (English: Republic of Lithuania) are inscribed above the coat of arms and the word "Pasas" (English: Passport) is inscribed below the coat of arms. Lithuanian passports have the standard biometric symbol at the bottom.

=== Identity information page ===
The Lithuanian passport includes the following data:

1. Photo of passport holder
2. Type (P for ordinary passports)
3. Code of Issuing State (LTU)
4. Passport No.
5. Surname
6. Given Names
7. Nationality
8. Date of Birth
9. Personal No.
10. Sex
11. Place of Birth
12. Date of Issue
13. Authority
14. Date of Expiry
15. Holder's Signatures

The information page ends with the Machine Readable Zone.

== Visa requirements ==
Countries and territories with visa-free entries or visas on arrival for holders of regular Lithuanian passports Lithuania Freedom of movement Visa free Visa issued upon arrival eVisa Visa available both on arrival or online Visa required prior to arrival

In 2019, Lithuanian citizens had visa-free or visa on arrival access to 180 countries and territories, ranking the Lithuanian passport 9th in the world according to the Henley visa restrictions index.

== Gallery ==
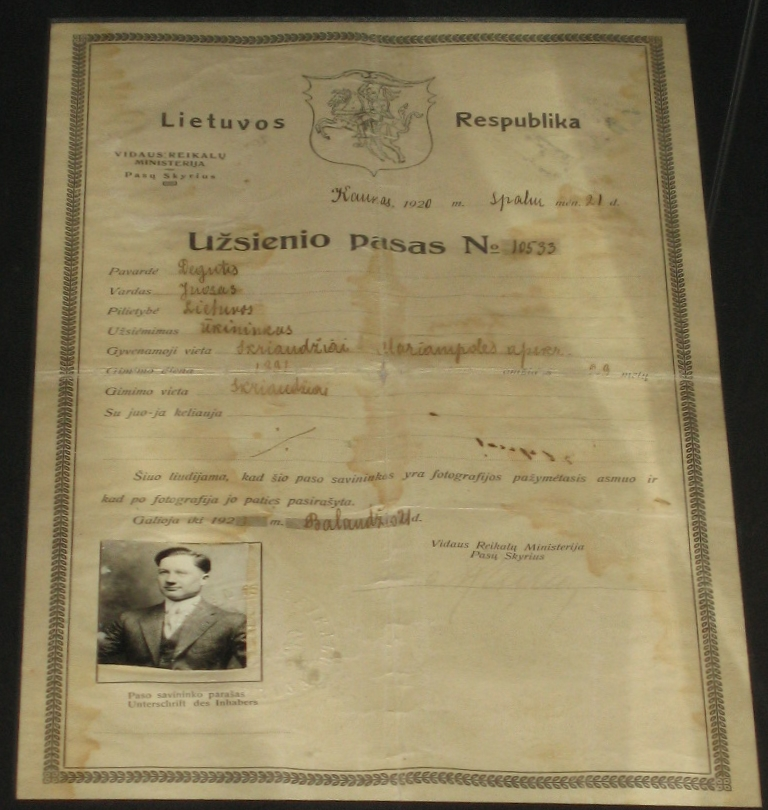
Lithuanian passport
issued in 1920

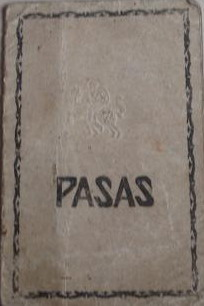
Lithuanian passport
issued in 1940

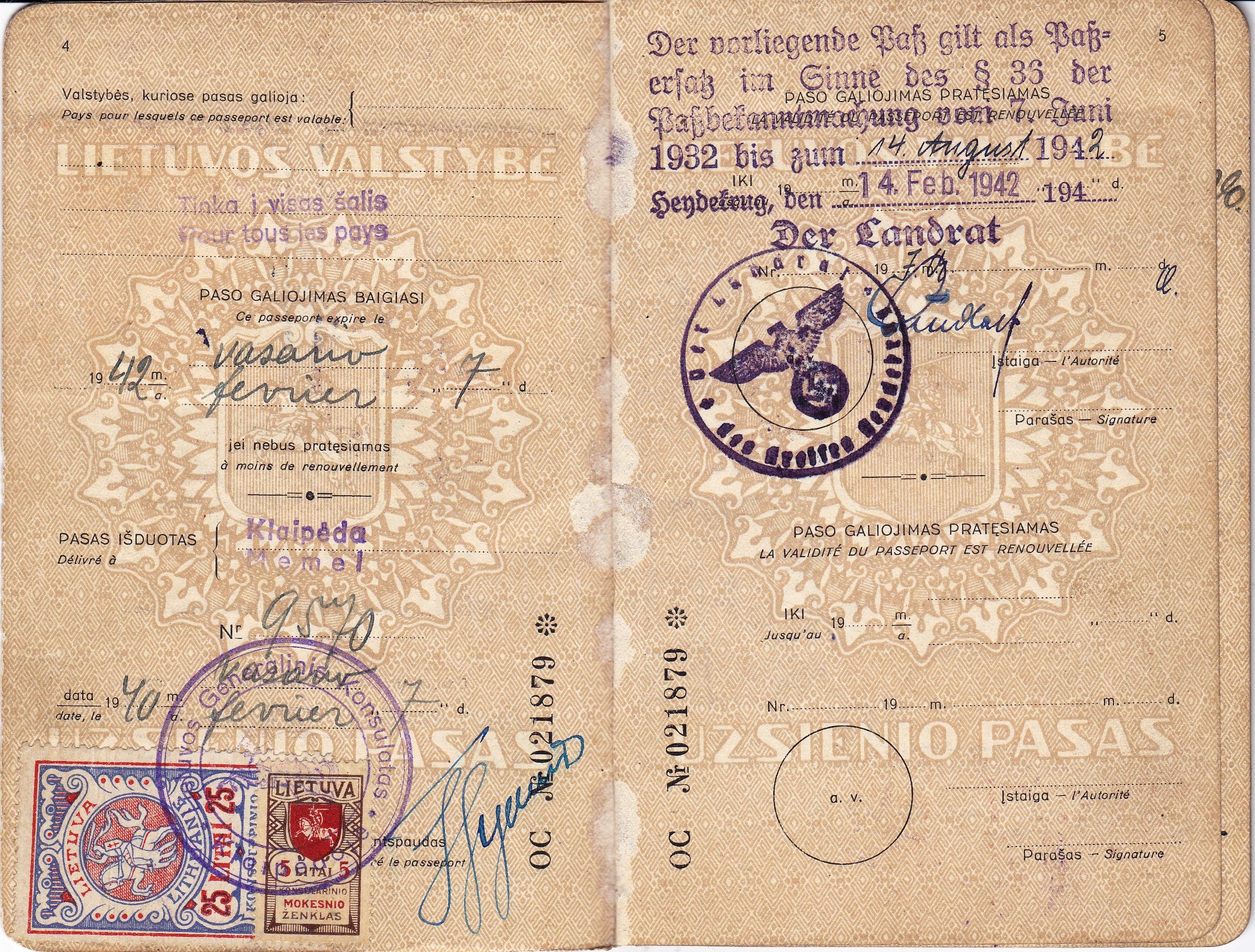
1940 consular Lithuanian passport issued at Memel, a year after it was handed over to Germany

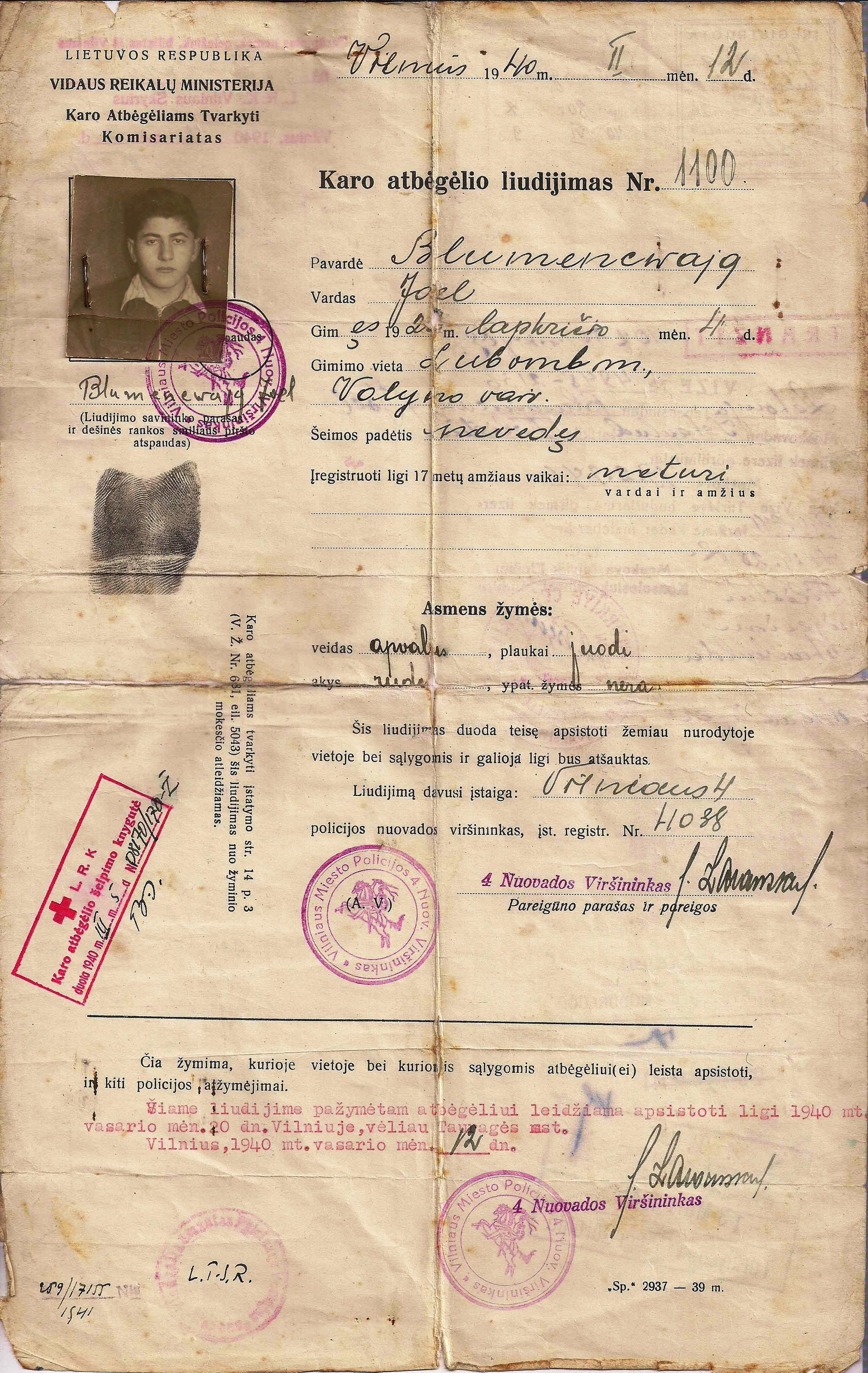
1940 Lithuanian emergency refugee travel document used by the Jewish holder to escape to British Palestine

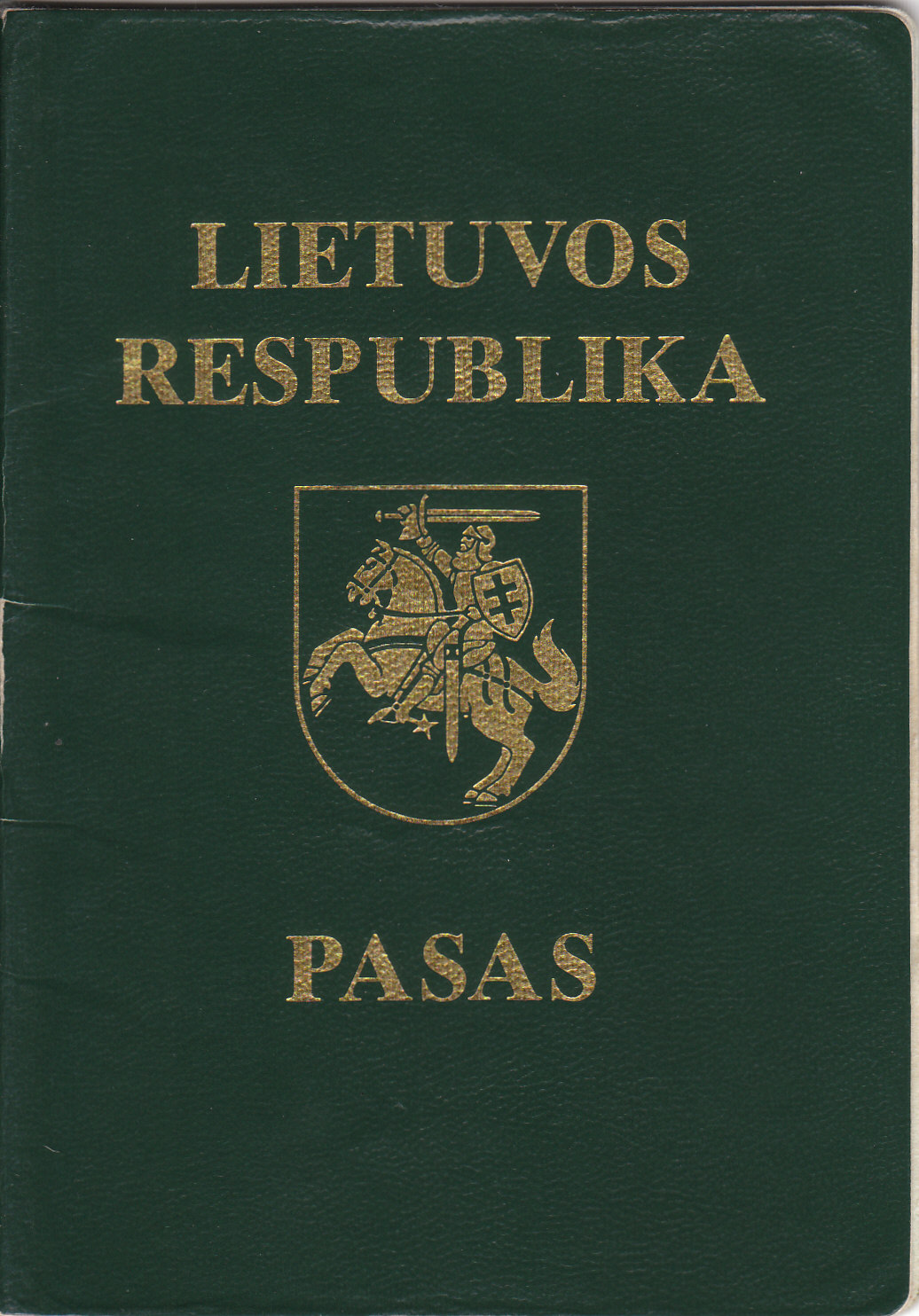
Lithuanian passport
1992-2002

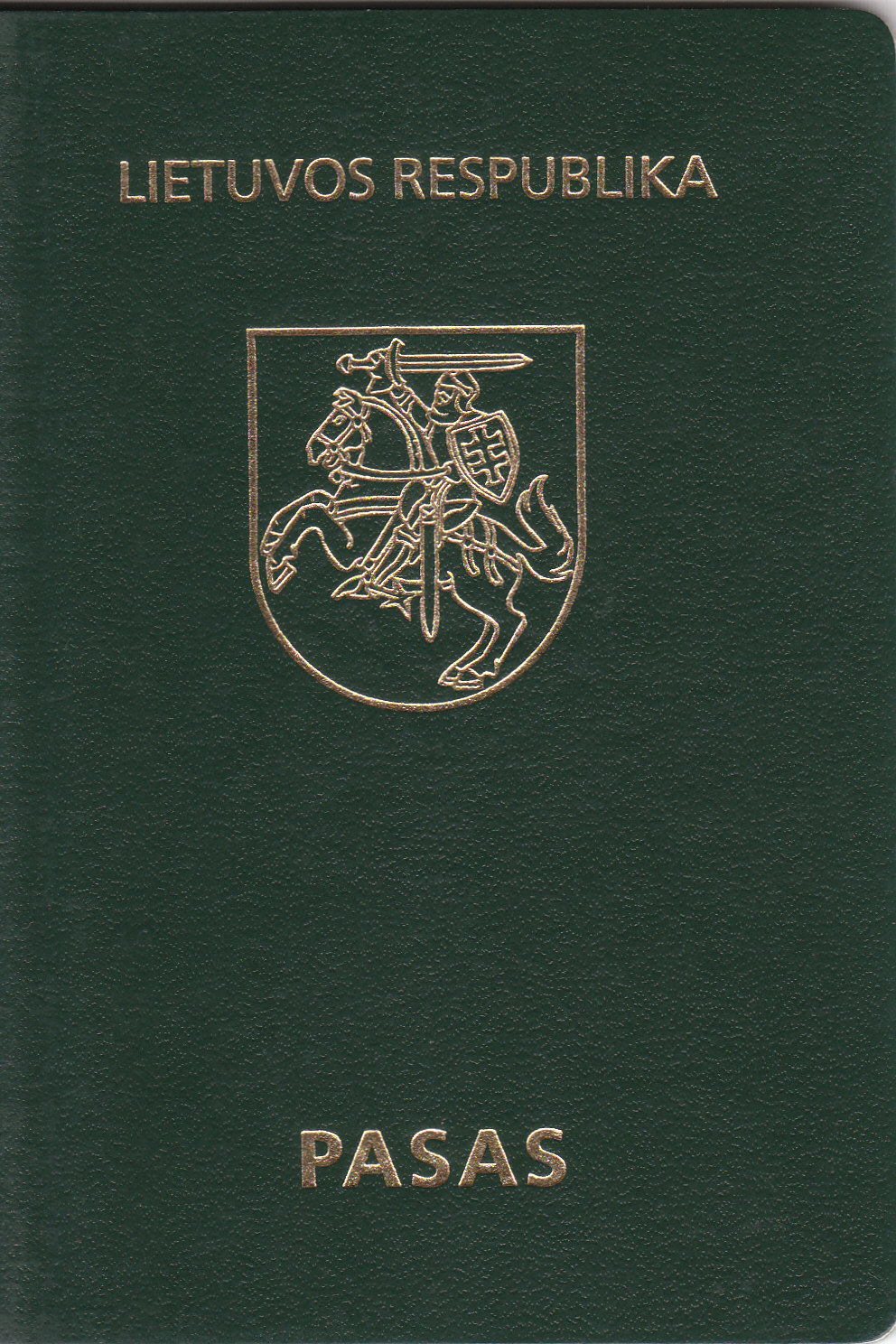
Lithuanian passport
2003-2006

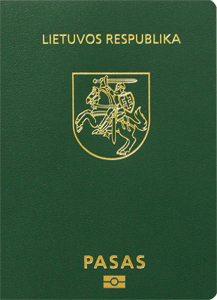
Lithuanian biometric passport
2006-2007

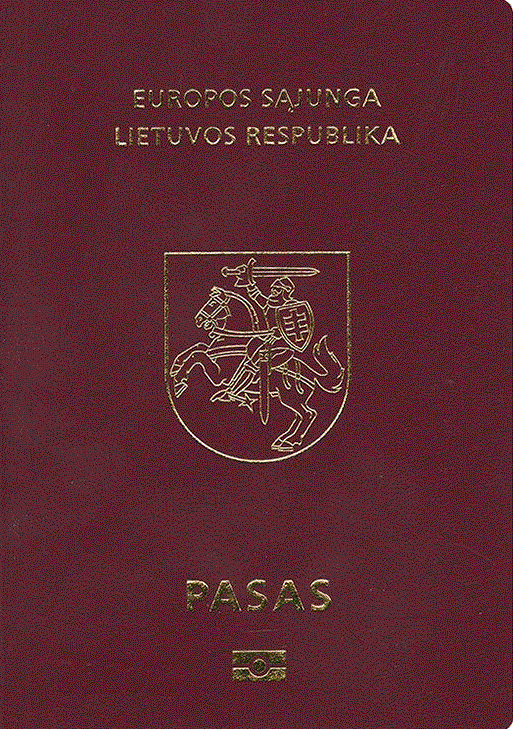
Lithuanian biometric passport
since 2008

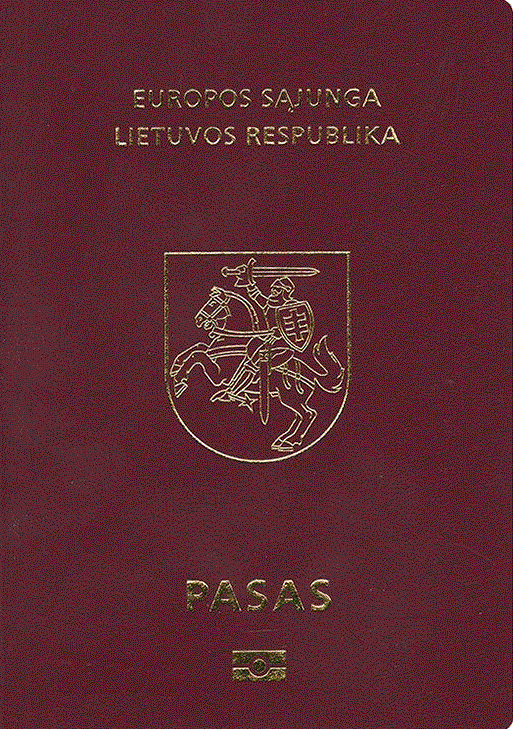
Lithuanian biometric passport
since 2019

== See also ==
- Visa requirements for Lithuanian citizens
- Passports of the European Union
