= Lithuanian identity card =

National identity card of Lithuania

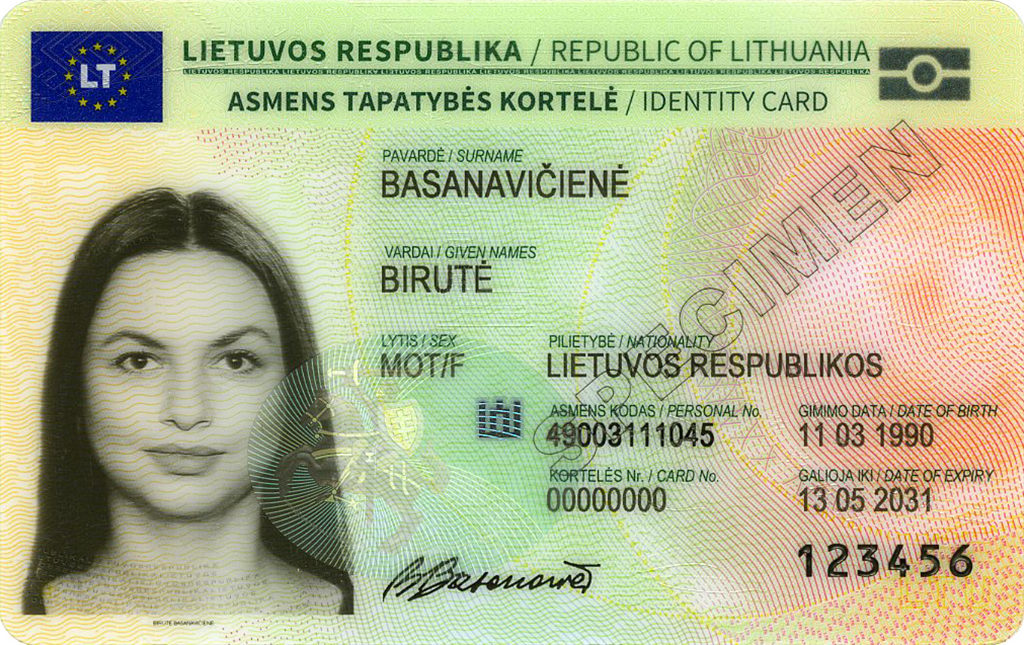
- The front of a Lithuanian identity card
- Type: identity document
- Issued by: Lithuania
- First issued: 1 January 2003
- Valid in: EFTA; European Union; United Kingdom (EU Settlement Scheme); Rest of Europe (except Belarus, Russia, and Ukraine) Georgia; Montserrat (max. 14 days); Overseas France
- Eligibility: Lithuanian citizenship
- Expiration: 10 years (age 16 or over); 5 years (age under 16)

The Lithuanian identity card (Lithuanian: asmens tapatybės kortelė) is an official non-compulsory identity document issued to Lithuanian nationals. It is issued by the Migration department in Lithuania and certain diplomatic missions. The cards were first introduced in 2003.

== Use ==
The ID card facilitates travel within the European Union and Schengen Area, as well as some other non-EU countries. Within the European Union, it may also be used as a primary evidence of the Lithuanian citizenship, as an alternative to the Lithuanian passport.

=== As electronic signature device ===
Since 2009, Personal Identity Cards are equipped with contact chips, allowing their usage as digital signature devices with a smart card reader. The Identity documents personalisation centre under the Lithuanian Ministry of the Interior provides digital signature software for Windows, Linux and Mac OS environments.

=== History ===
The first Lithuanian Personal Identity Cards were issued in January 2003. The issuance of these card continued until January, 2009, when they were superseded with biometric and digital signature-capable second-generation personal identity cards. In July 2012 issuance of slightly altered third-generation personal identity cards started.

== See also ==
- National identity cards in the European Union
- Lithuanian passport
- Identity document
- e-Residency of Lithuania
