= E-Residency of Lithuania =

Lithuanian virtual residency program

e-Residency of Lithuania is a program launched by Lithuania on 1 January 2021. The program will allow non-Lithuanian citizens to access services provided by the Lithuanian government and other institutions, such as company formation, declaration of taxes and opening of bank accounts. It provides the e-residents with a smart card, similar to the Lithuanian identity card, which can be used for electronic identification and electronic signature.

The e-residency scheme is aimed towards location-independent entrepreneurs such as software engineers and it is modelled after the e-Residency of Estonia.

== Application ==
An application for e-residency can be made online by filling a form to the Migration Department of Lithuania (Lithuanian: Migracijos Departamentas). The applicant must then physically present themself to the Migration Department for the identification and collection of the biometric data. The biometric data collection service is provided by the diplomatic missions or the external service providers, thus making it possible to complete the application abroad. The status of an e-resident is granted for 3 years. As of 2026, the application fee is 90 Euros.

The application is subject to certain checks, concerning national security, prevention of money laundering, etc. It also includes checks in the Schengen Information System for alerts by the other EU members.

== Legislation ==
The status of e-residence is established and regulated by the Law on the Legal Status of Foreigners 2004 with the amendments from 2019. The authority which implements the legislation is the Migration Department under the Ministry of the Interior. The legal framework for the electronic identification and signatures is established by the Law on Electronic Identification and Trust Services for Electronic Transactions.

== Statistics ==
In January 2023, the head of the Migration Department reported that the e-residency status was granted to more than 300 people. Taiwanese Minister of Digital Affairs Audrey Tang became the first minister to obtain the e-residency in Lithuania.

== See also ==
- E-governance
- E-government
- Economy of Lithuania
- Taxation in Lithuania
