= Benefits.gov =

- Website type: US Government Information
- Available in: English, Spanish
- Owner: U.S. Department of Labor
- Creator: U.S. Department of Labor
- Website: www.Benefits.gov
- Launched: April 2002
- Current status: Retired

The logo of Benefits.gov

Benefits.gov (formerly GovBenefits.gov) was launched by the U.S. Department of Labor in April 2002, as a website designed to provide American citizens with access to government benefit eligibility information. Benefits.gov helps citizens determine their potential eligibility for more than 1,000 government-funded benefit and assistance programs. Visitors can complete an on-line questionnaire, and Benefits.gov matches benefit programs with their needs and provides information on how to apply.

Benefits.gov includes information on a variety of benefit and assistance programs for veterans, seniors, students, teachers, children, people with disabilities, dependents, disaster victims, farmers, caregivers, job seekers, prospective homeowners, and more.

== Facts and figures ==
- People served: over 220 million people (as of Aug 2024)
- Referrals to partner agencies: 32 million
- Average monthly visitors: 1.1 - 1.3 million
- Benefits provided: over 1,100 (as of Aug 2024)

== Shutdown ==
At the end of September 2024, the website was shut down and replaced by benefits subpages found on the websites USA.gov and USAGov en Español. This was a result of Executive Order 14058 by President Biden in 2021, which directed the General Services Administration to “develop a roadmap for a redesigned USA.gov website that aims to serve as a centralized, digital ‘Federal Front Door’ from which customers may navigate to all Government benefits, services, and programs, and features streamlined content, processes, and technologies that use human-centered design to meet customer needs, including consolidating content currently appearing on Benefits.gov, Grants.gov, and other appropriate websites [...]”

Key features include:

- A centralized, singular, user-friendly location to access benefits information.
- A search engine called Benefit Finder that helps users locate benefits programs and determine eligibility.
- Category-based navigation organized by type and “life events”.

However, there was some opposition to the new design. The first Federal Chief Information Officer, Mark Forman, told Nextgov/FCW that “A big focus for the original design was finding what you needed within 3 clicks or less […] noting that he was skeptical of USA.gov's new focus on ‘life events’ as a way to organize parts of the website.”

== Govloans.gov ==
Govloans.gov, the sister site of benefits.gov, was launched in 2004, and provides information about government loan programs. Govloans.gov features information about loans for:

- Housing
- Education
- Agriculture
- Small business
- Veterans
- Disaster relief
