= Susan Sorenson =

American sociologist

Susan B. Sorenson
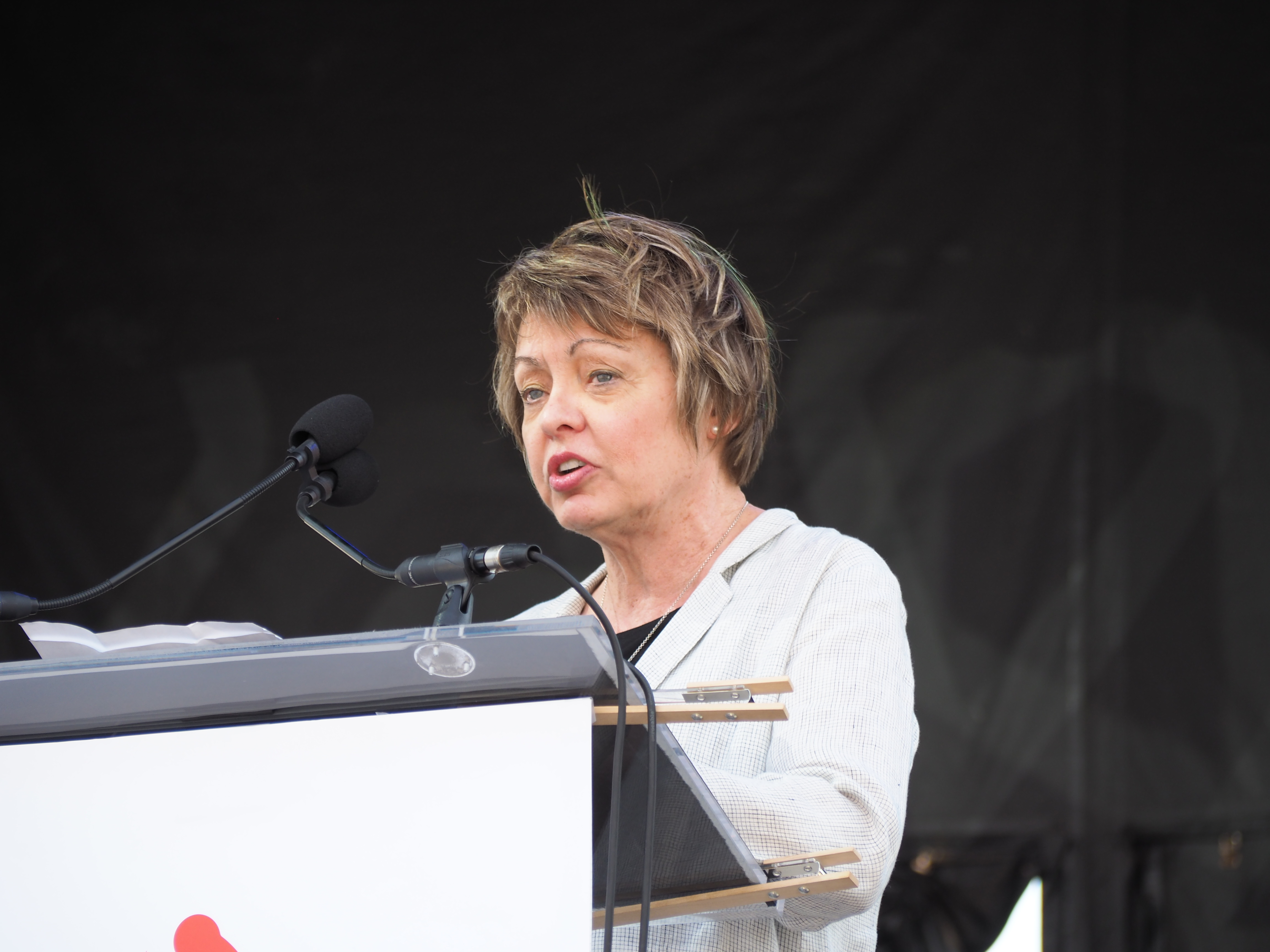
- Education: Iowa State University, Illinois Institute of Technology, University of Cincinnati
- Awards: 2014 Bridge of Courage Award from Women Organized Against Rape
- Scientific career
- Fields: Public health, social policy
- Workplaces: University of Pennsylvania
- Thesis: Loss and childhood depression (1985)

Susan B. Sorenson is a professor of social policy, and of health and societies, at the University of Pennsylvania. She is also a senior fellow in public health, director of the PhD program in social welfare, and director of the Evelyn Jacobs Ortner Center there. She is known for studying gun violence from a public health and political perspective, and she has argued for increasing the availability of data to researchers regarding this subject.

By July 2018, Soren's 1988 paper analyzing the epidemiology of obsessive–compulsive disorder in five different communities was the third most cited paper on the disorder.

== Education ==
Sorenson received her B.S. in sociology and psychology from Iowa State University, her M.S. in psychology from the Illinois Institute of Technology, and her Ph.D. in clinical psychology from the University of Cincinnati. Subsequently, she was a post-doctoral scholar in psychiatric epidemiology at the UCLA School of Public Health.

== Awards and honors ==
Sorenson was appointed a fellow of the American Psychological Association's Society for the Psychological Study of Social Issues in 2007. She received the Bridge of Courage Award from Women Organized Against Rape in 2014.
