= Lithuanian nationality law =

Law on Citizenship

Parliament of Lithuania
- Long title: Republic of Lithuania Law on Citizenship
- Citation: Nr. XI-1196
- Enacted by: Government of Lithuania
- Status: Current legislation

Lithuanian nationality law operates on the jus sanguinus principle, whereby persons who have a claim to Lithuanian ancestry, either through parents, grandparents, great-grandparents may claim Lithuanian nationality. Citizenship may also be granted by naturalization. Naturalization requires a residency period, an examination in the Lithuanian language, examination results demonstrating familiarity with the Lithuanian Constitution, a demonstrated means of support, and an oath of loyalty. A right of return clause was included in the 1991 constitution for persons who left Lithuania after the Soviet occupation in 1940 and their descendants. Lithuanian citizens are also citizens of the European Union and thus enjoy rights of free movement and have the right to vote in elections for the European Parliament.

== Contemporary implementation ==
In 1989, the legislature passed a nationality act granting automatic citizenship to those persons who could establish their own birth, or that of a parent or grandparent, within Lithuanian borders. Permanent residents not covered by these criteria were granted citizenship upon signing a loyalty oath. Language proficiency was not required. A 1991 treaty with Russia extended the definition of residency to those who had immigrated to Lithuania from Russia between 1989 and the ratification of the treaty. Subsequent applicants for citizenship were required to meet a set of naturalization standards, including Lithuanian language testing.

At that time, the citizenship requirements were the most liberal compared to the other Baltic states following the independence restoration. This was commonly attributed to a relatively low level of immigration from the former Soviet Union, especially Russia, and a more ethnically homogenous population.

== Dual citizenship ==
Lithuanian passport

=== 2006 Constitutional Court decision ===
In November 2006, the Constitutional Court of the Republic of Lithuania ruled that the Law on Citizenship (wording of 17 September 2002 with subsequent amendments and supplements) was "controversial, inconsistent and confusing". At issue was the possession of dual citizenship; the provision extended the right of citizenship, and hence the right to vote, to members of the post-war Lithuanian diaspora, which was concentrated in the United States, Canada, Australia, and Argentina, and their children, grandchildren, and great-grandchildren. The most notable member of this diaspora was Lithuanian President Valdas Adamkus, who had become a United States citizen; he formally renounced US citizenship before taking the oath of office.

The petitioners held that basing citizenship on ethnic origin or nationality of the person violated the equality of persons and was discriminatory. The use and meaning of the term "repatriated" was especially controversial. The Lithuanian Seimas (parliament) passed a temporary law, expiring in 2010, that granted dual citizenship in exceptional cases, most notably to those who were Lithuanian citizens prior to 1940 and who fled during the Soviet occupations, as well as to their children and grandchildren.

The Constitution states that Lithuanian citizenship is acquired by birth except in certain cases established by law and that no person may be a citizen of Lithuania and another country or state at the same time, except in special cases. This provision of the Constitution can only be changed by a referendum.

=== 2010 and 2016 amendments ===
During November 2010 the Seimas passed a law liberalizing dual citizenship requirements. President Dalia Grybauskaitė vetoed it, stating that "according to the Constitution, dual citizenship is a rare exception, not a common case."

On 23 June 2016, the Seimas passed a law further liberalizing dual citizenship requirements. It went into effect on 6 July 2016, amending the Law on Citizenship of the Republic of Lithuania (Law XI-1196 Dec 2, 2010). Article 7 of the Law on Citizenship as amended on 23 June 2016 lists the following criteria for dual citizenship:

1. They have acquired citizenship of the Republic of Lithuania and citizenship of another state at birth.
2. They are a person who left Lithuania before 11 March 1990. This is defined as:
  - at least one of their ancestors (parents, grandparents or great grandparents) was a citizen of the Republic of Lithuania (between 1918 1940);
  - the ancestor left Lithuania (the law changed the former 'fled' requirement) some time before Lithuania restored its independence on 11 March 1990;
  - the ancestor did not depart to the former Soviet Union after 15 June 1940.
3. They are a person who was exiled from the occupied Republic of Lithuania before 11 March 1990.
  - They are a person, or their descendants (children, grandchildren, great-grandchildren), who until 15 June 1940 had Lithuanian citizenship and was forcibly deported from Lithuania before 11 March 1990, because of political, social, or ethnic persecution by Soviet and Nazi occupation regimes.
4. They have by virtue of marriage to a citizen of another state ipso facto acquired citizenship of another state.
5. They are adopted by citizen of the Republic of Lithuania before reaching 18 years of age.
6. They have acquired citizenship of the Republic of Lithuania by way of exception while being a citizen of another state.
7. They are a person who has retained citizenship of the Republic of Lithuania or who has citizenship of the Republic of Lithuania restored for their outstanding merits to the State of Lithuania.
8. They have acquired citizenship of the Republic of Lithuania while having refugee status in the Republic of Lithuania.

Some countries (such as Argentina, Uruguay and Mexico) do not allow renouncing their citizenship, so applicants might de facto keep dual citizenship even if they are eligible only for single Lithuanian citizenship.

In certain cases, only restoration of Lithuanian citizenship as single Lithuanian citizenship is allowed. For example, persons that voluntarily left to former USSR countries prior to 1990 (i.e. were not deported) and have Lithuanian ancestors can restore Lithuanian citizenship but have to renounce their current citizenship. This does not apply to the people that fled or left during the Soviet occupation before 1990 and these persons can restore dual citizenship.

In 2018, at the request of Lithuanian parliament, the constitutional court clarified that being a citizen of both Lithuania and another state at the same time is not acceptable. Those who left Lithuania after it regained independence in 1990 cannot hold dual citizenship therefore it could be changed only by referendum.

=== Failed referendums ===
Two referendums to change the constitution to allow dual citizenship were held in 2019 and 2024. In both cases, while the necessary turnout was met and the majority of those who voted (73.45% and 74.49% respectively) did so in favor of changing the constitution, the motion failed since not enough (i.e. less than 50%) of the voting electorate voted ‘yes’.

=== Current law ===
Currently, the law on citizenship allows dual citizenship only in exceptional cases for those whose ancestors left Lithuania before the independence restoration in 1990, but still had Lithuanian citizenship in 1940. There are some things to consider before someone could be able to pass the Lithuanian citizenship eligibility, and by having these, gives the person the right to claim Lithuanian citizenship.

Persons who were citizens of independent Lithuania (between 1918 up to 1940) as well as their children, grandchildren, and great-grandchildren can restore Lithuanian citizenship. Persons of Lithuanian descent can restore dual Lithuanian citizenship if their ancestor still had Lithuanian citizenship in 1940. Dual citizenship can also be extended to descendants of Lithuanian citizens who were exiled to Siberia and stayed in Soviet Union countries.

== Certificate of Lithuanian Descent ==
The Certificate of Lithuanian Descent is a document confirming the ethnic Lithuanian origin of a person. The certificate gives an indefinite right to obtain Lithuanian citizenship, to obtain a visa to Lithuania, to apply for permanent residence in Lithuania. A certificate of Lithuanian origin may be obtained by persons who have at least one of their parents, grandparents or grandmothers who are ethnic Lithuanians by nationality.

== Certificate of Right to Restore Lithuanian Citizenship ==
The Certificate of Right to Restore Citizenship of the Republic of Lithuania is an official document entitling its holder to obtain Lithuanian citizenship by descent (as a rule, upon renunciation of the existing citizenship). In addition, the certificate of the right to restore Lithuanian citizenship entitles its holder to obtain a visa to Lithuania, to apply for permanent residence in Lithuania.

== Citizenship of the European Union ==
Because Lithuania forms part of the European Union, Lithuanian citizens are citizens of the European Union under European Union law. As such they have the right to vote in elections for the European Parliament. When in a non-EU country where there is no Lithuanian embassy they have the right to get consular protection from the embassy of any other EU country present in that country. Since 1 May 2011 —the end of the transitional period for new member states— Lithuanian citizens can live and work in any member state of the EU as a result of the right of freedom of movement granted in Article 21 of the Treaty on the Functioning of the European Union.

A citizen of Lithuania is also a citizen of a member state of the European Economic Area (EEA). The Citizens' Rights Directive defines the right of free movement for citizens of the EEA, which includes the three EFTA members Iceland, Norway and Liechtenstein plus the member states of the EU. Switzerland, which is a member of EFTA but not of the EEA, has a separate multilateral agreement on free movement with the EU and its member states. As a result, the Lithuanian nationality allows for freedom of movement in any of the states of the EU / EEA / EFTA / Switzerland.

== Travel freedom of Lithuanian citizens ==
Visa requirements for Lithuanian citizens are administrative entry restrictions by the authorities of other states placed on citizens of Lithuania. In 2015, Lithuanian citizens had visa-free or visa-on-arrival access to more than 180 countries and territories, ranking the Lithuanian passport 10th in the world according to the Visa Restrictions Index.

In 2017, the Lithuanian nationality is ranked twenty-second in the Nationality Index (QNI). This index differs from the Visa Restrictions Index, which focuses on external factors including travel freedom. The QNI considers, in addition to travel freedom, on internal factors such as peace & stability, economic strength, and human development as well.

Visa requirements for Lithuanian citizens
