= E-governance in the United States =

Electronic governance (e-governance) in the United States describes the systems by which information and communication technology are used to allow citizens, businesses and other government agencies to access state and federal government services online. Since the increased use of the Internet in the 1990s, people in the United States can now access many government programs online, including electronic voting, health care and tax returns. They can also access governmental data that were not previously available.

== Three models of interaction in e-government ==
According to Andrew Chadwick and Christopher May, in their article Interaction between States and Citizens in the Age of the Internet: “e-Government” in the United States, Britain, and the European Union, there are three major models of interaction associated with e-government, the managerial, the consultative and the participatory.

- The managerial model stresses a vertical flow of information from the government to its citizens. This model is concerned with efficiency, especially with the increase in speed when delivering information and services, as well as a reduction of the costs. This model establishes a client type relationship between the government and its citizens.
- The consultative model also stresses vertical information flow but is more concerned with responding to needs of societal interest as expressed electronically by the citizens. This includes online elections, and other input from voters and requires an enormous amount of citizen involvement.
- The participatory model is the most interactive of the three major models of involvement between government and citizens. Unlike the other two, the participatory model strives for horizontal and multi directional flow of information that creates a cyber society that can be more effective for the general public. This model becomes relevant when universal access and widespread usage of the technology have become part of the norm in terms of government-citizen interaction.

Although at any given time these models of interaction can stand alone as the ideal form of involvement between the parties, often they overlap and provide multiple forms of interaction. These three models show potential ways for citizen and government interaction, there are advantages and disadvantages to the implementation of e-government and how it can affect people involved in the political process in the United States.

== Citizen involvement ==
Understanding the involvement and interaction between government and its citizens through the use of information and communication technologies (ICTs) is crucial when discussing e-governance in the United States. Holden defines e-government as “the delivery of government services and information electronically 24 hours per day, seven days per week.”

There are many benefits associated with e-governance in the United States and the involvement of citizens in the process. Due to e-governance, relevant information is more readily available to the public, while governmental programs become less expensive and more efficient. This allows most citizens to become part of the political process without leaving the comfort of their home. This increases the number of people willing to be involved in democracy and voice their opinions due to the instant access to the government.

Another benefit in citizen involvement in e-government is building trust between the citizens and the state. Over the past decades there has been a decline in citizens overall trust in the government. With such easy access to information, government programs and officials, e-government provides the perfect platform to start building the trust between these two parties.

There are also a few potential issues with citizen involvement associated with e-government.

Citizen involvement stems from problems with the actual technology used for e-governance and the potential that it will not always function as it is supposed to. A good example of this was the problems with the healthcare.gov website that was established to help citizens with healthcare information and enrollment during the Obama Administration. Since the technology initially did not consistently work, this limited the initial effectiveness of the program and ultimately made it more difficult instead of more efficient. The website has since been modified in the attempt to continue providing this healthcare e-governance service.

== Information dispersal and public engagement ==
Information dispersal and public engagement are key to the success of e-governance. However, the process of successfully engaging the public is quite complex. Due to the wide range of Internet advancements in recent years, the coordination of public engagement is difficult. Yet, the common desire to stay informed and find accessible methods to govern remains crucial.

== Prospective future of e-governance ==
The focus of technological implementation during each generation has faced a new and difficult sets of challenges. Previously, size and cost and function caused there to be a small focused use of computers. As computers became cost efficient and versatile there was difficulty dealing with the management of the new technology. Increasingly, privacy and security are becoming important issues. Since technology permeates our society and all of our lives are within the digital spectrum a whole new dimension of vulnerabilities is now needing to be addressed.

Currently, the focus majority of the government application has been the increase in efficiency and information and communication technologies. In the future, this trend will continue. Recently, increased emphasis has been placed in democratic engagement.

As new technology is developed new rules and policies have to be crafted, and old policies adapted, each time adding another layer of complexity to integration and potentially mitigating benefits from embracing new technology. Many government agencies have struggled to adjust to the adoption of digital data. Other agencies struggle to control the flow of information such as security and police organizations not sharing information, and the controversial gathering of too much information.

If e-governance in the United States is to advance the demand more sophisticated technological solutions for encryption, information sharing, and interactive communication will need to be addressed.
