= USAGov en Español =

- Website type: E-government
- Available in: Spanish; English (at USA.gov)
- Owner: U.S. General Services Administration
- Website: www.usa.gov/es/
- Commercial: No
- Launched: October 16, 2003
- Current status: Online
- Content license: Public domain

USAGov en Español (formerly GobiernoUSA.gov) is the official portal of the United States government in Spanish. It is the sister site of USA.gov, the official portal of the U.S. government in English.

USAGov en Español provides official U.S. government information and services in Spanish in a user-friendly way. It gives Spanish speakers access to government information and services, original content, email and social media channels.

It is not a direct translation of USA.gov, but is rather adapted to address the information needs of Spanish speakers. It does public outreach as well as community collaboration.

During natural disasters, USAGov en Español provides U.S. government information for Spanish speakers. In 2005, the portal aggregated official information in Spanish after Hurricane Katrina, offering information about federal and state benefits as well as assistance programs for disaster victims. The site adopted a similar response during the 2007 Southern California wildfires, which burned more than 1,500 homes.

USAGov en Español is part of the U.S. General Services Administration.

== History ==
USAGov en Español is part of USA.gov. USA.gov links to federal agency websites and to state, local, and tribal government.

USAGov en Español was launched on October 16, 2003, to support Executive Order 13166, signed by President Bill Clinton in 2000, which requires federal agencies to provide information and services for people with limited English proficiency (LEP).

The portal ispart of an integrated outreach effort created to address the government information needs of the estimated 41 million U.S. residents who speak Spanish at home, or about 12% of the population, according to the U.S. Census Bureau.

The portal was initially called FirstGov En Español but was renamed GobiernoUSA.gov in 2007 to reflect that it is the federal government's website in Spanish. It was redesigned in the summer of 2010. On February 23, 2011, the portal rolled out a mobile version of the site. It was renamed to USAGov en Español in the fall of 2017.

Originally a directory of federal websites, the website now includes state and local government directories. It also offers online services and original content about government programs and services in Spanish. In 2008, USAGov en Español launched a social media outreach campaign where users can receive updates and interact with the government through Facebook, Twitter and YouTube.

== Features ==
USAGov en Español offers a directory of federal, state and local resources in Spanish organized by topics in which users can find information. Additionally, the following features allow users to find information and services, and changes and new information.

- Original content: Users can read articles highlighting government programs and services. These articles feature interviews, video, and audio (with transcripts) with government officials on important topics such as immigration, education, health, and many others.
- Online services: Visitors can download and submit forms, perform searches, and find a large number of Spanish-language government services at the federal, state and local levels.
- Search engine: A search engine provides users official government search results in Spanish from federal, state and local government pages. The search capability is available from any page.
- Subscription services: Users can sign-up to receive free e-mail alerts and RSS feeds whenever information on the site is updated.
- Bi-directional toggle: Users can view the corresponding English page on USA.gov where applicable.
- Accessibility: USAGov en Español is accessible to all users.

== Outreach ==
To reach Hispanic audiences online, USAGov en Español has an outreach program. This includes:

- Social networking services: Users can engage with USAGov en Español on Twitter and Facebook and watch official government videos in YouTube.
- Partnerships in the Hispanic community: USAGov en Español disseminates information through some Spanish-language websites, including Univision, MSN Latino, AOL Latino, Terra, and others.

== Federal web requirements, guidelines, and multilingual committee ==
The portal attempts to preserve government information as outlined in the E-Government Act of 2002. It also follows policies set forth by the U.S. Office of Management and Budget Policy for Federal Public Websites.

USAGov en Español leads the Multilingual Community of Practice Websites Committee, a group of federal, state, and local web managers working to expand and improve digital content in languages other than English.
