= USA.gov =

Official web-site portal for the United States government

- Former name: FirstGov.gov (2000–2007)
- Website type: E-government
- Available in: English; Spanish (at USAGov en Español)
- Website: www.usa.gov
- Commercial: No
- Launched: September 22, 2000; 26 years ago
- Current status: Online
- Content license: Public domain

USA.gov is the official web portal of the United States. It is designed to improve the public's interaction with the United States government by quickly directing website visitors to the services or information they are seeking, and by inviting the public to share ideas to improve government. USA.gov links to every federal agency and to state, local, and tribal governments, and is the most comprehensive site in—and about—the United States government. While the primary target audience of USA.gov is the American public, about 25 percent of USA.gov's visitors come from outside the United States.

USA.gov is part of the Technology and Transformation Services in the General Services Administration (GSA). It includes the Spanish-language web portal to US government services, USAGov en Español.

== History ==
First logo used, from 1999 to 2001.

Logo as FirstGov.gov, used from 2001 to 2007.

Logo used, from 2007 to 2015.

Logo used, from 2015 to 2016.

Logo used, from 2016 to 2018.

USA.gov began in 2000 when Internet entrepreneur Eric Brewer, whose early research in parallel computing was funded by the United States Department of Defense, offered to donate a powerful search engine to the government. That donation helped accelerate the government's earlier work to create a government-wide portal. In June 2000, President Clinton announced the gift from the Federal Search Foundation, a nonprofit organization co-founded by Brewer and fellow entrepreneur David Binetti, and instructed that the portal be launched in 90 days.

FirstGov.gov was launched 87 days later on September 22, 2000, during the first-ever webcast originating from the White House Oval Office. GSA and 22 Federal agencies funded the initiative in 2001 and 2002. Since 2002, USA.gov has received an annual appropriation from the U.S. Congress.

The name FirstGov.gov was changed in 2007 to USA.gov, in response to user suggestions and telephone surveys.

On July 2, 2010, USA.gov revamped the website to improve user access to citizen services through new mobile applications for on-the-go instant access; public engagement platforms; and the fastest, most comprehensive search function for government information.

== Structure ==
USA.gov helps visitors find federal information in several ways, detailed below. Additionally, USA.gov invites the public to share feedback on apps they would find useful by using government information available on Data.gov and USAspending.gov, and to share ideas to improve government through public dialogues and government contests.

=== E-mail alerts ===
Visitors to USA.gov can sign up for free e-mail alerts in both English and Spanish, to learn about popular government topics and important services and benefits. The pages' subjects range from benefits, scams, and fraud, and contacting elected officials to hurricane recovery, travel, and jobs.

=== USAGov Contact Center ===
The contact center is a source for answers to questions about consumer problems and government services.

If visitors cannot find the government information they are looking for online, they can call or get help through a live web chat service.

=== USA.gov content ===
USA.gov provides information and links to government services and resources, including those related to federal employment, voter registration, tax filing, government benefits, national park reservations, disaster preparedness, auctions, United States travel, and consumer product safety.

The site's policy is to link to websites of the federal government, quasi-government agencies, and those created by public sector/private sector partnerships; state and local governments; and recognized Indian tribes. In rare instances, the sites link to websites that are not government-owned or government-sponsored if these websites provide government information and/or services in a way that is not available on an official government website.

=== Live chat ===
USA.gov offers live chat in English and Spanish, where service representatives can answer website visitors' questions about federal agencies, programs, benefits, or services.

=== RSS feeds ===
USA.gov and USAGov en Español offer RSS feeds to help the public stay up to date on useful government information. Website visitors can sign up for USA.gov RSS feeds, and the USAGov en Español.

=== Search.USA.gov ===
USA.gov's search engine supports transparency of government information by providing access to government web pages from U.S. federal, state, local, tribal, and territorial governments. The portal features navigation aids and agency-produced databases such as frequently asked questions, government forms, recalls, and government images. Search.USA.gov is also available on its mobile service. In addition, any U.S. government agency can apply through the USA Services Affiliate Program to install the Search.gov search capability on its own pages, thus allowing agencies at all levels to provide website searching for their own users.

=== Social media ===
USA.gov uses Facebook, Twitter, Instagram and YouTube and Instagram to distribute timely official U.S. government information and emergency information, announce official government events and observances, share official government photos and videos, and gather feedback from the public.

=== URL shortening ===
There was a URL shortening service, go.USA.gov, that was available to users that had a .gov email address (only .gov URLs were allowed to be submitted for shortening through this service). The service would then generate a random URL following go.USA.gov which would redirect the user to the longer .gov URL stored in the system. This service was sunset on September 18, 2022. There was also a similar service, 1.usa.gov, that was also sunset. go.USA.gov now instructs users to post the full link, as in most cases URL shortening isn't needed: "Before looking for alternative URL shortening solutions, you may want to consider if you need a short URL at all. Many social media sites are no longer limiting character counts in URLs. Our research with the public strongly suggests that a URL from your own domain is the most trustworthy. For example, see Medicare's Twitter feed. If you require short URLs, reach out to the agency's IT office that runs your website. They may be able to create a redirect URL. There are also commercial URL shorteners available. However, your usage of these may be impacted by policies your agency has in place."

== USAGov en Español ==
A part of USA.gov, USAGov en Español pulls together all of the U.S. government's Spanish-language websites and makes them easily accessible to the public in one central location. The site, which was developed by Spanish speakers, represents an outreach effort to some 43 million Americans who report speaking Spanish at home.

Although most of the resources shared on USAGov en Español are federal, the site also links to Spanish-language content provided by states, the District of Columbia, the Commonwealth of Puerto Rico, and local government websites.

Web visitors also can search all federal and state web pages for Spanish content through the site's search engine, call 1-844USAGOV1 for help in Spanish and English or chat with a representative online. Spanish-speaking visitors can sign up for e-mail alerts in Spanish to let them know about important benefits and services. The website also offers information on the same topic in both English and Spanish by simply clicking on a toggle button.

== Web best practices ==
USA.gov actively promotes best practices within the government web manager community to improve the overall quality of U.S. federal websites as well as public access to government information.

=== Interagency Committee on Government Information ===
USA.gov has a leadership role on the Interagency Committee on Government Information (ICGI), formed to meet requirements of the E-Government Act of 2002 (Public Law 107-347, 44 U.S.C. Ch 36). The ICGI drafts recommendations and shares effective practices for federal government information access, dissemination, and retention.

== Crisis response initiatives ==
USA.gov is a critical destination for information during national disasters. After the September 11, 2001, attack on the United States, USA.gov became a major tool for the U.S. government to provide the most accurate, timely, and comprehensive information, resources, and government services available during that crisis.

Several years later, in the wake of Hurricane Katrina in August 2005, USA.gov participated in efforts led by the Department of Homeland Security and worked with over 20 federal agencies to develop guidance to communicate response information related to the storm and its aftermath. Agencies were encouraged to coordinate web information to avoid duplication and inconsistencies so the public could quickly and easily find critical information.

Categories identified during Katrina matched information people would be looking for in "any" disaster, whether natural or man-made. The federal web community can now re-use a good deal of the content developed in response to the hurricane crisis, to enable them to be even better prepared when the next disaster occurs.

== Model to other government websites ==
USA.gov serves as a model for other government websites and adheres to all requirements and guidelines for federal websites, including those established by the E-Government Act of 2002, the U.S. Office of Management and Budget's (OMB) Policies for Federal Public Websites, and Section 508 of the Rehabilitation Act of 1973 regarding website accessibility. The site also follows requirements of the Privacy Act, the Federal Information Security Management Act, and other privacy and security requirements.

== Awards ==
USA.gov has won numerous awards and media endorsements, including:

- "Standard of Excellence Web Award" by Web Marketing Association, Inc. Listing among the "Best of..." by Money Magazine, "Favorite Places on the Web" by the Chicago Sun Times, "Hot Sites" by USATODAY.com, "Top 100 Classic Sites" by PC Magazine, and Time Magazine's 2007 "Top 25 Sites We Can't Live Without."
- It also has won "#1 Federal Government Website—Comparing Technology Innovation in the Private and Public Sectors," by the Brookings Institution; "#1 in Global E-Government Readiness" in the United Nations' Global E-Government Readiness Report 2005; "#1 in Overall Federal e-Government" by Brown University's Taubman Center for Public Policy; and the "Innovations in American Government Award" by Harvard Kennedy School.

USAGov en Español was named a finalist for the Arroba de oro, ("the golden @"), has won the Web Content Managers' "Best Practices" award, and consistently scores among the highest in government or private sectors in the American Customer Satisfaction Index.

== See also ==
- Federal government of the United States
