= Network of the Department of Government Efficiency =

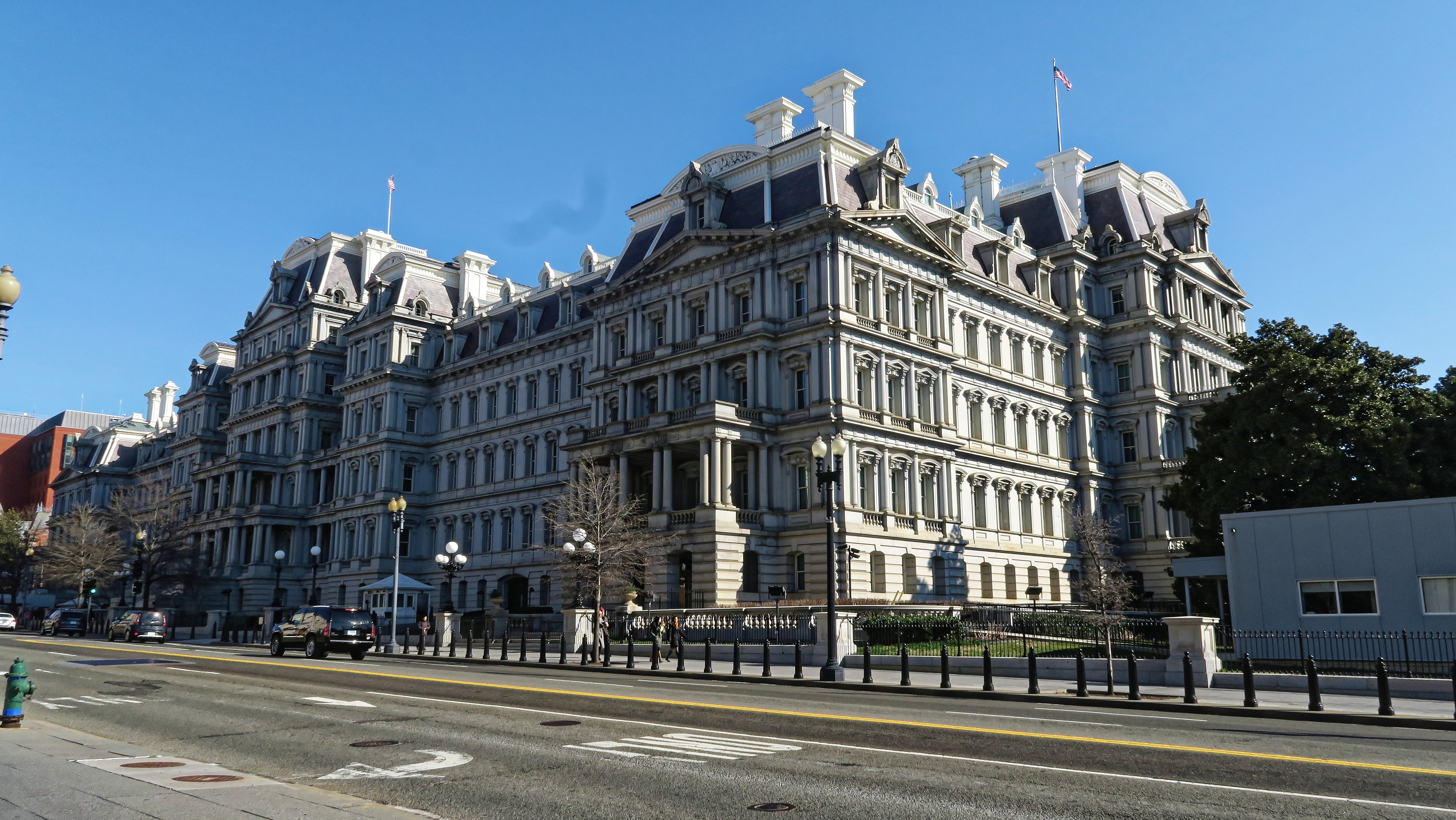
DOGE affiliates worked at the Eisenhower Executive Office Building.

The network of the Department of Government Efficiency consists of affiliates and allies associated with the Department of Government Efficiency (DOGE) in the second presidency of Donald Trump. DOGE personnel entered or joined various federal agencies with the stated purpose of modernizing information technology, maximizing productivity, and cutting excess regulations and spending within the federal government. They took control of information systems to facilitate mass layoffs. DOGE actions have met with various responses, including lawsuits.

Though the identities of DOGE personnel have not been officially disclosed, investigative journalists have reported that its staff included young programmers without government experience. Roughly 40 affiliates are tied to Musk; others come from Silicon Valley, the Trump administration, and the conservative legal movement. In July 2025, ProPublica tracked down more than 100 DOGE staffers, of whom at least 23 made staffing cuts to agencies that regulated industries in which they had previously worked.

DOGE's structure has not been published. While Amy Gleason was named acting administrator and Steve Davis reportedly managed daily operations, Trump said in February 2025 that Musk was "in charge" of it. In March 2025, a court declared Musk to be DOGE's de facto leader. Musk and his inner circle left DOGE at the end of May 2025. In November 2025, Office of Personnel Management Director Scott Kupor told Reuters that DOGE had ceased to exist. In follow-up questions, he told Time that OPM and OMB would "institutionalize" the changes made by DOGE.

== Background ==
=== Trump transition ===
On December 6, 2024, investigative journalists at The New York Times reported that several Silicon Valley billionaires tried to influence the Trump transition team toward deregulation of AI, crypto, and space industries. Those billionaires reportedly included Marc Andreessen, Jared Birchall, Michael Kratsios, and Shaun Maguire. On January 12, the Times reported that "an unpaid group of billionaires, tech executives and some disciples of Peter Thiel, a powerful Republican donor" were "preparing to take up unofficial positions in the U.S. government in the name of cost-cutting". Those individuals reportedly included Baris Akis, James Fishback, Brad Smith, Matt Luby, Rachel Riley, Joanna Wischer, and Vinay Hiremath.

=== "DOGE Kids" ===
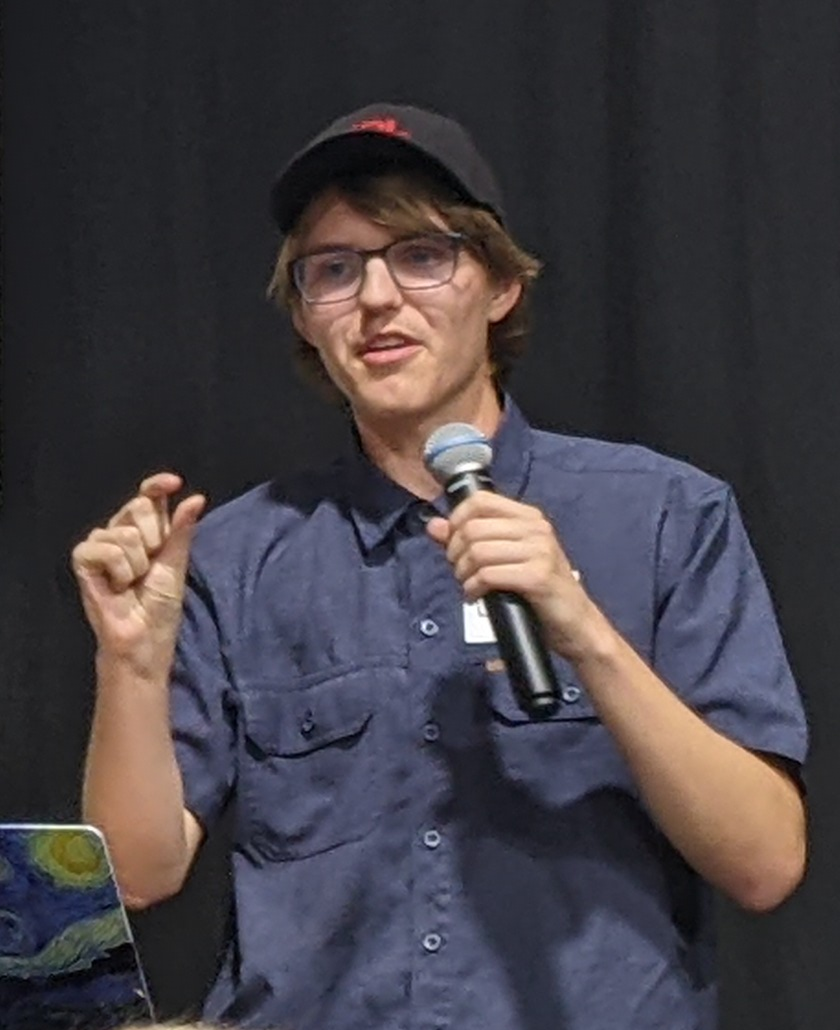
Luke Farritor is one of the several engineers aged 19–24 working for DOGE with little to no prior experience in government.

On February 2, Wired revealed that DOGE hired six coders aged 19–24 with no experience in government: Akash Bobba, Edward Coristine, Luke Farritor, Marko Elez, Gautier Killian, Gavin Kliger, and Ethan Shaotran. They reportedly conducted video interviews with federal workers without identifying themselves, with queries such as "whom they would choose to fire from their teams if they had to pick one person", and surprise code reviews, silently supervised by "extremely young men". They have been called "Doge Kids" by officials, reporters, and social media users.

Coristine has gone by the name "Big Balls" on the internet. According to Brian Krebs, his past poses security risks: the 19-year-old son of the LesserEvil owner leaked information from the company where he was interning, mingled with 'The Com', owned domains registered in Russia, and provided tech support to another cybercrime group. Kliger credited Ron Unz for his political awakening, reposting Nick Fuentes and Andrew Tate, along with supremacist memes. Elez too has an edgelord past, with posts such as "You could not pay me to marry outside of my ethnicity" and "Normalize Indian hate."

In February, Farritor and Kliger manually blocked payments for programs approved by Marco Rubio. According to Bloomberg, court documents filed by the Treasury on March 14 indicated that DOGE staffer Marko Elez violated Treasury policy by mishandling personal information. The filing went on to state the document was low-risk, but that Elez had violated policy due to not requesting approval and failing to use encryption. In May, court filings alleged Kliger coerced Consumer Financial Protection Bureau staff into working a 36-hour shift.

=== Doxing accusations ===
On February 4, Musk accused those who circulated the names of the DOGE kids of doxing. The next day, Ed Martin stated this violated the law. According to New York Times reporter Ken Bensinger, Musk was attempting to describe traditional journalism as doxing in order to invalidate the role of the media in government accountability.

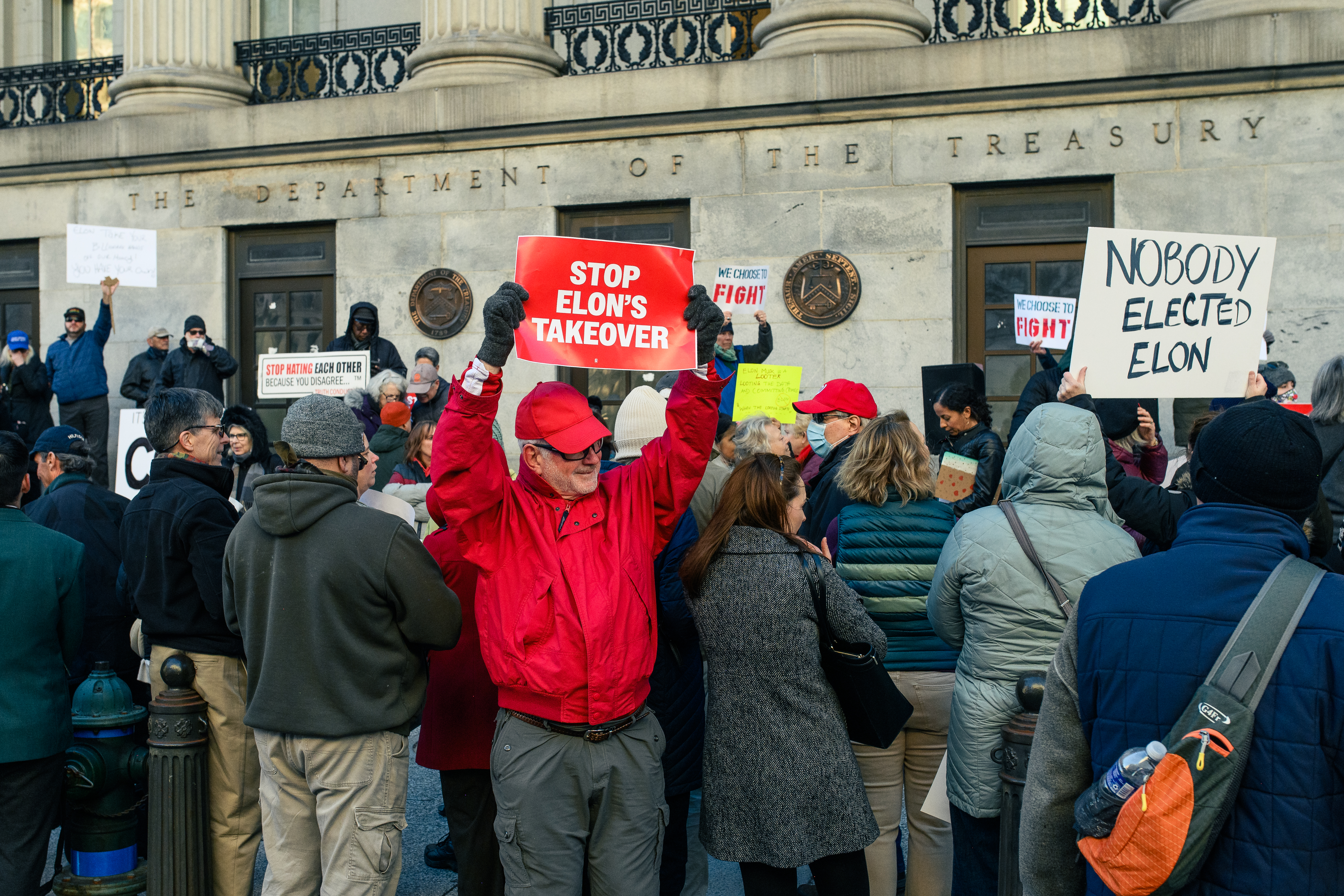
The "We Choose to Fight: Nobody Elected Elon" protest, organized by MoveOn, was held at the Treasury on February 4, 2025.

Several US Congress members spoke against Musk's role in the government during the "We Choose to Fight: Nobody Elected Elon" protests.

=== Names ===
On February 4, Wired identified Rajpal at the National Oceanic and Atmospheric Administration. The next day, The Guardian said Kliger, Farritor entered USAID with Jeremy Lewin and Pete Marocco. On February 7, NPR noted the opacity of the scope of DOGE's work and the identities of its members; it named four with senior roles: Ricardo Biasini, Tom Krause, Amanda Scales, and Thomas Shedd, all former employees of Musk's companies; CNN also said Farritor has been granted access to Department of Energy's information systems despite their chief information officer's objections, and Kliger, Rajpal, and Chris Young were reported by Wired at the Consumer Financial Protection Bureau; later Bloomberg also revealed Lewin, Young, and Jordan Wick in that operation.

On February 7, ProPublica identified three Supreme Court clerks. On February 11, Business Insider listed more than 30 DOGE members, including four they had newly identified. ProPublica also disclosed new names: Jenn Balajada, Nicole Hollander, and Ryan Riedel. Wired revealed the next day that the new chief information officers of the Office of Management and Budget (OMB), the Office of personal Management (OPM), and the Department of Energy (DoE) were tied to Palantir or SpaceX. The Washington Post published on the same day (February 7) that DOGE overtook 15 agencies with 30 DOGE operatives (staffers and allies); of the few it named, only Noah Peters and Alexandra Beynon were not known.

On February 24, Wired identified Farritor, Lewin, Rachel Riley, and Clark Minor at the National Institute of Health. Days later, The New York Times said much of DOGE's "operations are opaque, and most of its personnel have not been disclosed by the Trump administration"; they tracked the roles DOGE members officially took, and the agencies to which they were delegated, and also mapped the ties that could explain why the members were hired.

On March 9, WIRED followed suit, naming three affiliates tied to Palantir. At the end of March, Politico listed names from DOGE's "legal army". Wired mapped DOGE's corporate connections as known by the end of March. Musk appeared at the end of the month on Fox News, along seven DOGE advisors, whom The Hill profiled.

=== Transparency concerns ===
While a spokesperson for DOGE stated "increasing its transparency was a goal of the White House", some details about its operations were not made public by the administration. Some have criticized this, with David Ingram of NBC news describing it as an "opaque and changing organization". USDS staffers reported that the DOGE team embedded isolated themselves from the other members of the agency. CNN sent Freedom of Information Act (FOIA) requests in February for security clearance records of DOGE members who were granted access to sensitive or classified government data; the response, from an OPM email address, was: "Good luck with that they just got rid of the entire privacy team". Sources told CNN that employees from the communications staff and those who handle FOIA requests were also dismissed.

Administration officials have contested DOGE membership in internal communications, in public, and in courts. Amy Gleason argued in group chat she had no control over DOGE members hired by other agencies, nor any responsibility regarding their actions, including firings. General Services Administration (GSA) administrator and DOGE affiliate Stephen Ehikian stated "there is no DOGE team at GSA" even though DOGE leadership occupied the sixth floor at GSA protected by security, with IKEA bedroom furniture, a child's play area and washing appliances. In a legal case involving the Department of Labor, DOGE lawyers objected to the plaintiffs' meanings of "DOGE employee", "sensitive systems", "access", "records", and "authority", which they deemed "vague and ambiguous"; they restricted the concept of DOGE employee to "individuals who have a formal relationship" with the US DOGE Service. In a court case involving the "Fork in the road" mass email, DOGE member Jacob Altik has been presented as an OPM lawyer when trying to shut down the African Development Foundation along with other DOGE members.

Few DOGE members spoke to the press. Musk appeared on Fox News multiple times and spoke to Joe Rogan, but has been criticized for declining challenging interviews.

=== Leadership ===
One month after being taken over by DOGE, multiple legacy USDS employees could not identify its leadership. In a February 17 affidavit, Office of Administration director Joshua Fischer told Judge Tanya Chutkan that Musk was not the administrator or an employee of DOGE but a special government employee with no "authority to make government decisions". Trump declared two days later to have put "Musk in charge" of DOGE. At a February 24 hearing, Judge Colleen Kollar-Kotelly questioned the constitutionality of retrofitting DOGE as the United States Digital Service and asked the government attorney, Bradley Humphreys, about its structure; he said that he ignored Musk's role beyond that of Trump advisor. On the next day, Press Secretary Karoline Leavitt said that Musk is "overseeing DOGE" but refused to identify its administrator.

Later the same day, the White House named Amy Gleason, who worked from 2018 through 2021 at US Digital Service (USDS), as acting administrator. On February 28, Justice Department lawyer Joshua Gardner told Judge Theodore D. Chuang that he was unable to identify the administrator of DOGE before Gleason. In a filing submitted under seal but partly released in March, the Trump administration recognized that Gleason has been working at Health and Human Services at the same time that she said having worked full-time as an administrator of the US DOGE Service. At the end of February, neither the White House nor its lawyers could confirm who was running it.

In his March 4 joint address to Congress, Trump repeated that DOGE "is headed by Elon Musk". After being quoted in lawsuits days later, Trump reportedly told members of his Cabinet that they rather than Musk and DOGE were to make staffing decisions for their departments, but a few hours later remonstrated "If they don't cut, then Elon will do the cutting." On March 18, Chuang determined that Musk was "the leader of DOGE" and that his actions in dismantling USAID violated the Appointments Clause. In a May 21 Supreme Court filing, Solicitor General John Sauer told the court that Musk "is not part of" DOGE. In a separate lawsuit involving Musk's company X, his own lawyers stated that he is "in charge of" DOGE.

=== Departures ===
During Tesla's earnings call on April 22, Musk told his investors that he planned to reduce his government work, but that he will "likely" continue for the remainder of Trump's term. Musk clarified that he was not planning to step away from DOGE entirely, saying that he would "spend a day or two per week on government matters for as long as the president would like me to do so". Musk began working remotely around the same time, months after expressing his intent to ban remote work for federal workers. Musk's offboarding began on May 28 at the end of his scheduled time as a special government employee. Top Musk lieutenant Steve Davis, top DOGE advisor Katie Miller and DOGE general counsel James Burnham would be leaving as well. Trump officially thanked Musk during an Oval Office farewell on May 30, and said Musk was "not really leaving". During an interview with Brett Baier on June 1, Musk criticized the One Big Beautiful Bill Act for undoing DOGE's work. Shortly thereafter, the Trump–Musk feud occurred, placing the future of DOGE in question.

=== Institutionalization ===
After the Trump–Musk feud in June, OMB director Russell Vought told lawmakers that DOGE affiliates have become "institutionalized" and that he envisioned them "as in-house consultants as a part of the agency's leadership". Legacy employees told Wired they were asked not to call them "DOGE". At the same time, DOGE has continued to recruit tech workers, promising up to $195,000. According to Sahil Lavingia and other sources, Davis was still involved after he officially left, through Signal.

DOGE affiliates started to integrate other agencies, not as members of a separate organization embedded to them. Edward Coristine has disappeared from GSA's directory and joined the SSA, alongside Aram Moghaddassi; Joe Gebbia has been appointed as the first chief design officer of the National Design Studio; Jeremy Lewin joined the Department of State; Zachary Terrell has become HHS chief information officer; Rachel Riley has become the Office of Naval Research chief. Sam Beyda became CDC's chief of staff in late 2025. Amy Gleason was already an adviser to Robert F. Kennedy Jr. in March.

In November 2025, Scott Kupor told Reuters that DOGE had ceased to exist and that the government-wide hiring freeze was over. He later clarified that DOGE was no longer the "centralized entity", but that OPM and OMB would "institutionalize" its changes and keep its principles alive. According to a White House contingency plan, there were 45 DOGE officials in October. In January 2026, Bloomberg has found that 55 individuals responsible for workforce cuts did not receive salary compensation, like many early DOGE hires; this list also includes political appointees, such as Linda McMahon and Lee Zeldin. In April, a USDS official said the agency had 90 employees and planned to grow.

In July 2026, the Washington Post reported that two dozen staff vetted by DOGE remain staffed throughout the federal government, with many working at the National Design Studio.

== Composition ==
=== Type ===
DOGE members have been classified into leadership, staffers and allies; allies either have no formal affiliation with DOGE or joined the administration through other means. Types of staffer resemble DOGE teams mentioned in the first executive order: executive, tech, and lawyer. (Note: These generic concepts circumvent the inconsistent typologies used in the sources.) An "affiliate" is thus either a leader or a staffer.

=== Status ===
DOGE affiliation extends beyond employee status: personnel consisted of volunteers at first. While the Office of Presidential Personnel made political loyalty to Trump a cornerstone of its hiring strategy, DOGE employees were onboarded through a separate Musk-led process.

Special government employees have an advisory role limited to a 130-day work period that can be paid or unpaid. Those who earn a substantial salary have to disclose it. Unlike federal workers, special employees are allowed to keep outside salaries and may not need to disclose conflicts of interest.

=== Size ===
In February 2025, Trump told reporters that there were 100 DOGE employees. Musk said the next month that he planned to double that number. In the same month, Amy Gleason testified that there was about 79 appointed employees, and 10 employees seconded from other agencies.

According to a White House contingency plan, there were 45 DOGE officials in October. In January 2026, Bloomberg has found that 55 individuals responsible for workforce cuts did not receive salary compensation, like many early DOGE hires; this list also includes political appointees, such as Linda McMahon and Lee Zeldin.

=== Roles ===
Many DOGE members are embedded in other government units under specific roles. At least 23 employees hired at the OPM between 20 January and 20 February worked for DOGE. By March, DOGE was installed at GSA and SSA. DOGE teams have been detailed to almost every executive branch agency; six members affiliated to GSA tried to embed DOGE teams in units outside of it.

=== Ties ===
Wired mapped four connections: Musk (roughly 40 DOGE members were tied to him), conservative lawyers, Trump, and Silicon Valley. ProPublica found 29 executive managers, 28 engineers, 16 investors, and 12 lawyers; more came from finance than any other field; it also found that most staffers are young (60% under 40) men (83% male) with limited government experience. Bloomberg found connections between DOGE members and either Musk or Thiel.

At least 23 DOGE officials are making cuts at agencies that regulate where they previously worked. Many DOGE members made financial contributions to the Trump campaign.

=== Actions ===
Besides appearing in lists, DOGE affiliates were covered with specific news of their actions. Five were named when NBC broke the news that DOGE transferred data out of the Department of Labor on February 13: Sam Beyda, Derek Geissler, Cole Killian, Adam Ramada and Jordan Wick. On June 16, The New York Times listed the key 8 DOGE official involved with SSA.

== List of DOGE members ==
=== Compilations ===
Many teams of investigative journalists tracked the background, roles, and assignments of DOGE personnel. Their compilations vary in scope. No exhaustive list of DOGE members has been made public.

On February 6, 2025, ProPublica first published its "tracker"; with 109 names on its June 10 update, they claimed the most exhaustive list of DOGE affiliates. On February 16, Fast Company published 34 names. Two days later, TechCrunch compiled a list of DOGE staffers, and the senior advisors coming from Musk's inner circle; that list has been last updated on May 20 and contained 33 names. On February 28, The New York Times tracked the roles DOGE members officially took, and the agencies to which they were delegated, and also mapped the ties that could explain why the members were hired. At the time The New York Times updated its list mid-June 2025, it contained 86 DOGE members.

On March 6, Fortune identified DOGE "top players". The next day, Bloomberg published Thiel's network. On March 19, TechCrunch listed 19 founders and VCs working with DOGE WIRED published its "mapping" of 80 operatives that were added to the second Trump administration or the agencies. The Washington Post published a list on April 4 of "allies" and employees who work at the USDS who help carry DOGE objectives. Bloomberg published days later its second list, this time of Musk associates.

=== Keys ===
- ^{[a]} – ProPublica's "tracker"
- ^{[b]} – FastCompany's "staffers"
- ^{[c]} – TechCrunch's universe
- ^{[d]} – New York Times's "people"
- ^{[e]} – Fortune's "top power players"
- ^{[f]} – Bloomberg's Thiel network
- ^{[g]} – TechCrunch's 19 VCs
- ^{[h]} – WIRED's mapping
- ^{[i]} – Washington Post's "employees and allies"
- ^{[j]} – Bloomberg's Musk associates

=== Table ===
DOGE network
Name	Type	Roles	Ties	Involvement	See
Marc Andreessen	Ally – unofficial adviser^{[c]}^{[e]}		Musk – a16z backed SpaceX, xAI, and Twitter; Trump – transition team	Networked to hire talents; pushed for return-to-office	
Jared Birchall	Ally – unofficial adviser		Musk – wealth manager, Neuralink; Trump – transition team	Interviewed Department of State candidates	
Frank Bisignano	Ally^{[d]}	SSA commissioner	Fintech – Fiserv, First Data Corp JPMorgan Chase, Citigroup		
Nate Cavanaugh	Affiliate – staffer^{[d]}	USIP acting president; GSA^{[a]}^{[b]}	Startups – Brainbase, FlowFi^{[i]}	ICH; entered USADF, IAF, IMLS, NEH, MBDA; contacted the Vera Institute; appeared on Fox News made a video deposition	
Edward "Big Balls" Coristine	Tech – coder	SSA senior advisor (June 2025–); CISA; GSA	Musk – Neuralink intern; Tesla.sexy LLC owner; The Com;	Appeared twice on Fox News; accessed CISA systems granted access to USCIS databases	^{[a]}^{[c]}^{[j]}^{[d]}
Steve Davis	Leadership – second in command (Feb–May 2025)	EOP, OPM, GSA	Musk – SpaceX, Twitter, Boring; Atlas Society advisor	Occupied a GSA floor; involved in the SSA takeover; tried to hold a meeting after having left	^{[a]}^{[c]}^{[d]}^{[j]}
Leland Dudek	Ally^{[d]}	SSA acting commissioner (February to May, 2025)	Facilitated DOGE entry at SSA	Threatened to shutdown SSA; placed on leave after contesting Trump's 40% claim; wrote an op-ed in the New York Post	^{[a]}^{[d]}
Stephen Ehikian	Ally and Executive^{[d]}	GSA acting administrator(Feb–July 2025)	Musk – spouse worked at X; Salesforce; AI startup	Transferred USIP building to GSA at no cost; replaced by Michael Rigas	^{[a]}^{[d]}
Marko Elez	Tech – coder	USDT	Musk – SpaceX, X, xAI, Neuralink	Fired from DOGE for past racist posts; re-hired after JD Vance's intervention; accidentally published an API key for 52 xAI LLMs in a GitHub repository	^{[a]}^{[c]}^{[d]}
Luke Farritor		GSA senior advisor	Musk – SpaceX; Thiel Fellowship	Helped DOGE recruitment; accessed at least 12 databases (HHS, DOS, etc.)	^{[a]}^{[d]}^{[c]}^{[f]}^{[j]}
James Fishback	Ally	DOGE (Feb–May 2025)	Trump – Launched his investment fund at Mar-a-Lago in December 2024	Claimed to have advised DOGE. Suggested a "DOGE dividend"; distanced himself from DOGE during the Trump–Musk feud	^{[e]}
Justin Fox		GSA	Finance – Nexus Capital Management	Detailed: NLRB, USADF, IAF, NEH, USIP, the Wilson Center, MEC, etc.In deposition, struggled to define DEI	
Joseph Nicholas "Joe" Gebbia	Ally	OPM (Feb–Aug 2025); National Design Studio chief design officer (Aug 2025–)	Musk – Tesla board; Trump – supports Robert Kennedy Jr	Appeared on Fox News rolled out OPM's fully digital retirement application system; left to lead new National Design Studio	^{[d]}
Amy Gleason	Leadership–DOGE leader	USDS acting administrator	Smith – Russell Street Ventures; Trump – USDS	Nominally over both USDS and USDSTO and reports to Susie Wiles	^{[c]}^{[d]}
Antonio Gracias	Ally	SSA	Musk – old friend, Tesla and SpaceX early investor, America PAC funder; Trump – transition	Involved in the SSA takeover; pushed anti-immigrant myths in media and townhall	^{[a]}^{[d]}^{[j]}
Michael Grimes	Ally^{[d]}	DOC advisor	Musk – Twitter acquisition; Morgan Stanley	Expected to lead the new sovereign fund	^{[a]}^{[j]}^{[d]}
Adam Hoffman	Executive^{[a]}	National Security DOGE Leader	Musk – Citadel LLC, financial firm with investments in X and Tesla	Led efforts across national security apparatus; left at the end of 2025 to work for Kushner's Gaza taskforce	^{[a]}
Jared Isaacman	Ally	NASA administrator	Musk – SpaceX	Nomination pulled after the Trump–Musk feud then reupped	^{[j]}
Gavin Ian Kliger	Tech – engineer	CFPB senior advisor to the Director, OPM, USAID, IRS	Musk – Tesla stock owner; Edgelord past; Ron Unz fan; Databricks: disclosed 1–5M in Databricks; LinkedIn	Manually blocked USAID payments authorized by Rubio; CFPB: abuse toward other CFPB employees; potential conflict of interest	^{[a]}^{[d]}^{[c]}
Tom Krause		USDT acting Fiscal Assistant Secretary of the Treasury (Feb–Jun 2025)	Musk – Citrix and Twitter share underwriter; still CEO of Cloud Software Group, where he axed thousands of jobs, some leading to security weaknesses^{[g]}	Granted access to Bureau of Fiscal Services system; appeared on Fox News; involved in USAID's dismantlement; disclosed interests conflicting with USDT	^{[a]}^{[j]}^{[a]}^{[d]}^{[c]}
Michael Kratsios	Ally – recruiter		Trump – Chief Tech Officer in the first administration, wrote the 2020 pro-AI investment executive order; Thiel – Thiel Capital	Helped find the DOGE core members	^{[c]}^{[f]}
Jeremy Lewin	Lawyer	USAID chief operating officer; received $167,000 from GSA; DOS acting head of foreign assistance (April 2025)	Musk – Munger, Tolles & Olson (Tesla); Trump – defended Matt Gaetz	Authorized USAID shutdown; overrode 58 objections to grant the Gaza Humanitarian Foundation $30 million racism and violence issues	^{[a]}^{[j]}^{[d]}^{[c]}
Katie Miller	Leadership – spokesperson (Jan-May 2025)		Trump – Mike Pence press secretary during the first administration, wife of White House deputy chief of staff Stephen Miller	SSA takeover; left to work with Musk on May 25, 2025	^{[a]}^{[d]}^{[c]}
Aram Moghaddassi	Executive	SSA chief information officer	Musk – Neuralink, Twitter	Detailed at DOL; appeared on Fox News; froze aid payments at USDT granted access to USCIS databases	^{[a]}^{[c]}^{[j]}
Elon Musk	Leadership – de facto leader	Senior advisor to the president (Sep 2024–May 2025)	Trump – spent $290 million to elect him, spent weeks at Mar-a-Lago	Authored an op-ed; involved in the SSA takeover; appeared on Fox News five times; resigned in May	^{[a]}^{[c]}
Vivek Ramaswamy	Leadership – co-leader	DOGE (Nov 2024–Feb 2025)	Startup – Roivant Sciences;Thiel – Strive Trump – endorsed his Republican nomination, endorsed by him	Authored a Wall Street Journal op-ed; recruited first candidates; lobbied Vought; left on January 20, 2025	
Rachel Riley	Executive	HHS senior advisor(–Mar 2025)	Smith – colleague; McKinsey & Company	Requested access to Medicare payment systems; declared a stake in Patriot Family Homes; resigned in March, 2025; replaced the admiral in charge of the Office of Naval Research in October	^{[a]}^{[b]}^{[d]}^{[j]}
Gary Shapley		IRS acting administrator (–Apr 2025)	Trump – first administration	Put into the role by Musk without having consulted with Trump or Scott Bessent; fired, and replaced by Michael Faulkender	
Thomas Shedd	Ally^{[d]}	GSA (TTS acting director), chief information officer (DOL)	Musk – Tesla engineer	Lead ai.gov	^{[a]}^{[c]}^{[d]}^{[j]}
Russ Vought	Ally – ^{[d]} administrative guide	OMB acting director	Trump – same role under the first administration; Center for Renewing America	Shut down CFPB	
Owen West		DOD	Trump – assistant secretary of defense in first administration; Goldman Sachs former financial analyst	Involved in push for US drone dominance	
