= US federal agencies targeted by DOGE =

United States government units targeted by the Department of Government Efficiency

During the second Trump administration, the Department of Government Efficiency (DOGE) took control of the federal government information systems in order to downsize federal agencies. DOGE embedded units from the executive branch of the government, including cabinet departments and various types of independent agencies. It targeted regulatory agencies and units from the legislative branch. It also targeted quasi-autonomous non-governmental organizations and organizations outside the federal government.

This operation allowed Elon Musk and a network of operatives to facilitate mass layoffs, to terminate contracts, and to slash regulations. Many public records were modified or removed from federal websites and databases. These actions have fostered reactions by federal workers, civil society, and the public, ranging from protests to lawsuits.

== Overview ==
=== Timeline ===
DOGE arrived at OPM on Inauguration day. By February, DOGE had tried to dismantle the Centers of Medicare and Medicaid Services, the Consumer Financial Protection Bureau, the Department of Education, the Federal Emergency Management Agency, the National Oceanic and Atmospheric Administration, and the United States Agency for International Development (USAID). February 14, 2025, became known inside the civil service as “the Saint Valentine’s Day massacre.” On that day, OPM directed agencies to fire probationary employees. Probationary employees are those who have just been hired and do not yet have full civil service protections.

=== Impact ===
The Wall Street Journal found that, in February 2025, the units most affected by DOGE contract terminations were: USAID, Health and Human Services (HHS), Social Security Administration (SSA), the Department of Education (Ed), and General Services Administration (GSA).

== Classification ==
In 18 U.S.C. section 6, an agency "includes any department, independent establishment, commission, administration, authority, board or bureau of the United States or any corporation in which the United States has a proprietary interest".

The concept of government corporation has no single definition in the U.S. Code. The chapter on government corporations from the US Code stipulates that "government corporation" refers to a corporation wholly owned by the government or with mixed ownership, and provides a list of the current ones. This list excludes the United States Postal Service, which is an independent agency that acts like a corporation.

In the executive order establishing DOGE, an agency is defined by section 551 of title 5 of the United States Code, with the proviso that "such term does not include the Executive Office of the President or any components thereof". Executive orders 14210, 14219, and 14222, also related to DOGE, refer to 44 U.S.C. 3502, with the same proviso.

== Executive Office of the President ==
=== Office of Management and Budget (OMB) ===
Russell Vought, a Project 2025 contributor close to DOGE, was nominated as the OMB director on February 6, 2025. The New York Times reported that, along with Stephen Miller, Steven Davis, and Elon Musk, Vought was planning the takeover of the federal information systems early in the government transition.

On May 23, NPR revealed that DOGE member Ethan Shaotran used his General Services Administration email address to send a "2025 Survey of Surveys" to federal agencies, seemingly bypassing OMB's authority; the survey contains a warning that agencies that fail to participate face adverse actions.

=== United States Digital Service (USDS) ===
The day of his inauguration, Trump signed executive order 14158, reorganizing the USDS as the U.S. DOGE Service and granting the new USDS "full and prompt access to all unclassified agency records, software systems and IT systems" to the "maximum extent consistent with law". The next day, DOGE instructed USDS employees by email to sign up for 15-minute interviews, which were led the next day. Wired reported that Thomas Shedd was leading the interviews, alongside so-called "DOGE Kids".

USDS had 230 employees in 2024. In February 2025, it had 65, until a third of the remaining ones resigned in protest. DOGE members Steve Davis and Brad Smith met with USDS officials weeks before the inauguration.

== Cabinet departments ==
=== Agriculture ===
On February 14, U.S. Department of Agriculture (USDA) Secretary Brooke Rollins revealed that DOGE has been at the agency for "a few weeks", welcomed their efforts, and expected full compliance from USDA teams, while farmers and policymakers raised concerns about the funding freeze. One month later, more than 100 USDA offices faced lease termination. By July, DOGE personnel had administrative access to the National Payment Service, which controls government payments and loans to farmers and ranchers, and contains loan application records with personal information.

==== Farm Service Agency (FSA) ====
DOGE has reviewed FSA loans.

==== National Finance Center (NFC) ====
In early February, DOGE accessed the NFC.

==== National Plant Germplasm System (NPGS) ====
DOGE fired the 300 scientists who were maintaining the 600,000 genetic lines of some 200 crop species at the National Plant Germplasm System; a temporary retraining order reinstated some of the 300 scientists.

==== Natural Resources Conservation Service (NRCS) ====
In March, DOGE announced the closing of 59 FSA and NRCS.

==== United States Forest Service (USFS) ====
On February 5, USFS employees could not access their performance review portal.

At the start of April, DOGE terminated a tree planting program in St. Louis, citing anti-DEI push.

=== Commerce ===
==== Minority Business Development Agency (MBDA) ====
DOGE member Nate Cavanaugh sent a letter on April 17 to notify MBDA's 41 business centers that all their grants were terminated.

==== National Oceanic and Atmospheric Administration (NOAA) ====
On February 4, DOGE entered NOAA. Nikhil Rajpal was granted editorship to all NOAA Google sites. Staff from the NOAA Information Technology group and the Department of Commerce attempted to keep them from the systems according to security protocols, but they defied authorized security staff and forcefully entered the facilities. Operatives were also looking for anything connected to diversity, equity, and inclusion (DEI) on bulletin boards and were inspecting bathroom signs to ensure compliance with Trump's executive orders.

On February 17, DOGE released 1,127 federal contracts spanning 39 federal departments and agencies, which included several NOAA contracts. DOGE announced the "deobligation" of $1,073,496 from the Office of Oceanic and Atmospheric Research's (OAR) Uncrewed Systems Research Transition Office (UxSRTO) that was for "scientific, engineering, and technical support".

On February 27, The Hill reported that the firing of probationary employees has begun.

As of February 28, the landing page of the NOAA External Affairs website reads: "Due to the recent layoffs at NOAA, all members of the External Affairs team were relieved of their duties."

==== United States Census Bureau (USCB) ====
DOGE announced in May that it terminated five surveys from the USCB, without specifying which ones.

=== Defense ===
DOGE met with Department of Defense (DOD) personnel on February 14, 2025. As of March, the cuts in staff were expected to impact up to 8% of its civilian workforce, or 61,000 employees.

In his West Point address on May 24, Trump said he wasn't cutting "10 cents" from DOD budget.

In June, DOD announced it would no longer provide critical satellite weather data to scientists and weather forecasters.

==== Army Corps of Engineers (USACE) ====
DOGE's cuts at the USACE has led to the closing of more than 425 Pennsylvania campsites.

==== Office of Naval Research ====
Rachel Riley has replaced Rear Admiral Kurt J. Rothenhaus as chief of the Office of Naval Research.

=== Education ===
On February 6, The Washington Post reported that DOGE staff fed sensitive data from ED into an AI to cut any spending, including contracts, declared "not essential to operations or required by law." DOGE members Adam Ramada, Alexandra Beynon, and Brooks Morgan were involved in the project. Around that time, DOGE had access to data on federal student aid, including the personal financial information on the more than 42 million people who receive student loans from the government, and Akash Bobba along with Ethan Shaotran, both 22 years old, had administrator-level status in ED's email system; Shaotran has reportedly accessed the back end of the ed.gov. DOGE had taken over the VIP offices on the seventh floor of the D.C. headquarters by February 12.

On February 26, ED stopped accepting and processing all income-driven repayment plans and consolidation applications for at least 3 months. Such plans are designed to keep payments affordable for student borrowers, and provide a path to student loan forgiveness. In March, it was reported that ED would lay off "about 50%" of its workforce, about 2,200 workers.

==== Institute of Education Sciences (IES) ====
On February 10, DOGE said it terminated contracts funded by IES totalling $900 million, including contracts involving student resources that were in-progress. The IES funds research to examine the effectiveness of current education policies and systems. Many contractors involved in maintaining the research database were also terminated. The institute is "all but shut down."

=== Energy ===
On February 5, 2025, the Department of Energy (DOE) secretary, Chris Wright, against guidance of the General Counsel and chief information officers, allowed Luke Farritor access to DOE information systems. CNN quoted DOE staff in the general counsel and chief information offices as calling Farritor's access a "bad idea", and that "He's not cleared to be in DOE, on our systems."

==== National Nuclear Security Administration (NNSA) ====
Farritor's access included systems to the NNSA . On February 13, 350 NNSA employees who secure and guard America's nuclear arsenal, including about 100 employees of Pantex, the primary United States nuclear weapons assembly and disassembly facility, were fired due to DOGE. The next day, all but 28 of those firings were rescinded by NNSA acting director Teresa Robbins. The agency sought to rehire the workers the next day. An Energy Department spokesperson said fewer than 50 were fired.

==== Nuclear Regulatory Commission (NRC) ====
According to ProPublica, Nicholas Gallagher, a DOGE affiliate at the General Services Administration, was involved in conversations about overhauling environmental rules.

=== Health and Human Services ===
By February 5, 2025, DOGE gained access to financial systems at HHS (HHS). Systems accessed include the Healthcare Integrated General Ledger Accounting System (HIGLAS), which require privacy protections training under the Health Insurance Portability and Accountability Act (HIPAA).

On March 3, HHS employees were told they could apply for early retirement over the next ten days. They were also instructed to comply with DOGE's emailed request to list their accomplishments from the past week, but to do so without revealing sensitive information. In mid-march, the staff responsible for the Medical Expenditure Panel Survey (MEPS) was told that at least 80% of them will be terminated.

In March 2025, DOGE cancelled $877 million in HHS grants to the Texas Department of Health and $482 million in HHS grants to the Florida Department of Health.

DOGE froze billions in healthcare grants in April, to review them under a program it called "Defend the spend".

In May, Wired reported that all contracts for agencies under the HHS umbrella need to go through a new approval process called the Departmental Efficiency Review (DER)

In June, HHS officials were told to resume the previous process for grants.gov, and to not route through DOGE staff.

==== Agency for Healthcare Research and Quality (AHRQ) ====
The Agency for Healthcare Research and Quality's staff was cut by 75%.

==== Centers for Disease Control and Prevention (CDC) ====
The Washington Post reported on February 5 that DOGE had sought access to data at the CDC.

==== Centers for Medicare and Medicaid Services (CMS) ====
On February 5, DOGE gained access to payment and contracting systems at the CMS. CMS officials refused to say which medical and financial records DOGE had gained access.

==== Food and Drug Administration (FDA) ====
On February 17, DOGE agents fired staff from the FDA involved in ongoing clinical trials of the safety of Elon Musk's Neuralink company, which creates implantable brain–computer interfaces (BCIs) as commercial products.

==== National Institutes of Health (NIH) ====
On February 24, Wired reported that DOGE members Luke Farritor, Rachel Riley, Jeremy Lewin, and Clark Minor had access to the National Institutes of Health's systems that control finance, budget, procurement, property, and grants.

In a March 27 Fox interview, Brian Smith talked about their work reforming NIH. The next day, Robert F. Kennedy Jr said DOGE created a new HHS organization chart. In a Fox interview, Brian Smith talked about their work reforming NIH.

==== National Institute for Occupational Safety and Health (NIOSH) ====
On April 1, over two-thirds of employees at the NIOSH were terminated. That includes Coal Workers Health Surveillance Program (CWHSP) team, and most of the NIOS engineers, staff, and scientists. A number of lab animals have been abandoned and later euthanized; a study on causes of cancer in firefighters and health care to emergency personnel of the World Trade Center terrorist attacks were also disrupted.

=== Homeland Security ===
On February 9, DHS Secretary Kristi Noem said that DOGE had access to her agency's data, including federal disaster aid recipients' personal information.

==== Federal Emergency Management Agency (FEMA) ====
On February 7, DOGE accessed FEMA database (FEMA Go) with private and sensitive information of disaster victims; Edward Coristine was part of the team.

On February 10, Musk incited Republican outrage by posting on X about FEMA funding of migrant shelter hotels in New York City. He said DOGE had discovered the funding, and falsely asserted that the funds were intended for disaster relief but had been illegally redirected to house migrants in "luxury hotels". The funds had been appropriated by Congress in 2024 under FEMA's "Shelter and Services Program" created by Congress in 2023, and they are separate from disaster relief funds. A few hours after Musk's post, Cameron Hamilton, the acting head of FEMA, said FEMA stopped payments under a variety of grant programs, and has given DOGE full access to FEMA's financial management system.

Musk's false allegation led the Department of Homeland Security to fire four FEMA employees that day, including the CFO, alleging they were "deep state activists". The next day, homeland security secretary Kristi Noem said she had "clawed back the full payment that FEMA deep state activists unilaterally gave to NYC migrant hotels". The city comptroller confirmed that $80 million had been withdrawn from the city's bank account.

==== Office of Biometric Identity Management (OBIM) ====
By May 5, DOGE was at the OBIM.

==== Transportation Security Administration (TSA) ====
DOGE initiated changes to the budget that impacted the National Explosives Detection Canine Team Program the same week that Trump celebrated K9 Veterans Day; vet visits and food supplies had been suspended.

=== Housing and Urban Development (HUD) ===
On February 10, DOGE member Scott Langmack emailed HUD employees and asked them to list every contract at the bureau, to note which were critical, and which contained any DEI components.

In February 2025, the new Trump-appointed HUD director, Scott Turner, was ordered to lay off about half of HUD’s employees, or nearly 4,300 people.

On February 26, DOGE gained access to a system from HUD that contains confidential information about alleged victims of housing discrimination, including victims of domestic violence. Information includes medical records, financial files, documents that may list Social Security numbers and other private information. Records in this database were generally not anonymized.

==== Federal Housing Administration (FHA) ====
On February 18, 2025, DOGE began to eliminate half of FHA staff, beginning with FHA insured loans jobs.

==== Office of Community Planning and Development ====
On February 22, NPR reported that DOGE's cuts will reduce staff at the Office of Community Planning and Development by 84%.

==== Office of Field Policy and Management (FPM) ====
On May 18, all employees at the General Schedule 13-level and below in the FPM, the office which supports HUD goals and operational capacity across its regional field offices, will be terminated.

=== Interior ===
In March 2025, DOGE sought access to a federal payment system within United States Department of the Interior (DOI), resulting in senior leaders expressing concerns to Secretary Doug Burgum and then put on administrative leave.

In April, Burgum gave DOGE representative Tyler Hassen authority over DOI department and bureaus to lead a consolidation effort.

==== National Park Service (NPS) ====
DOGE plans to terminate the lease of Utah's National Parks' central hub, which could displace hundreds of employees, NPS vehicles, and archaeological artifacts.

==== United States Bureau of Reclamation (USBR) ====
In late January 2025, DOGE members flew to California to order the release of water from the Jones Pumping Plant near Sacramento, but they were not successful. This is likely related to the 2025 California wildfires and the 2025 water release from Lake Kaweah and Lake Success publicity stunt.

=== Justice ===
==== Bureau of Alcohol, Tobacco, Firearms and Explosives (ATF) ====
In late June 2025, The Washington Post reported that DOGE staff were working alongside ATF general counsel with the intent to revise or eliminate 50 gun regulations by July 4.

=== State ===
In mid-April 2025, DOGE member Jeremy Lewin became acting administrator of the Department of State (DOS) foreign assistance program, replacing Pete Marocco.

=== Treasury ===
On January 31, 2025, Treasury Department (USDT) Secretary Scott Bessent granted DOGE access to his systems. The New York Times connected this action to Trump's earlier funding freeze.

On February 4, a Treasury Department official wrote to federal lawmakers that a DOGE agent, Tom Krause (who is also CEO of Citrix Systems) was restricted to "read-only" access to the Treasury payments system, preventing "payments for obligations such as Social Security and Medicare to be delayed or re-routed", though Wired reported that another member of Musk's team, Marko Elez, had acquired unrestricted access to some Treasury systems, and had been making "extensive changes" to the codebase of the payments system, with limited supervision. Democratic senator Ron Wyden, ranking member of the finance committee to whom the letter was sent, said it "reeks of a cover-up". Senior Treasury officials stated in February 11 federal court filings that the department had "mistakenly" and "briefly" granted Elez "read-write" access enabling him to alter the system; the Trump administration said in its court filings that an internal investigation had shown that Elez did not take unauthorized actions despite being able.

Radio France Internationale wrote about DOGE's group entry into the federal government:

"One of them now has direct access to the US Treasury computer system responsible for virtually all government payments. That is, taxpayers' tax returns, civil servants' salaries. That's billions of dollars that this young engineer can now manage, under the sole supervision of Elon Musk."

On February 5, NBC News reported that attorneys for the Justice Department had agreed to temporarily restrict staffers associated with DOGE from accessing information with the Treasury Department. This change came after a lawsuit was filed by a group of union members and retirees against the Treasury Department. This left Elez and Krause in place, but with a restriction not to disclose information to anyone outside the Treasury. Elez resigned on February 6 after The Wall Street Journal reported on deleted social media posts where he explicitly identified himself as a racist and advocated for eugenics and against inter-ethnic marriage.

A coalition of nineteen states, mostly Democratic-led, filed suit in a Manhattan federal court on February 7 seeking to stop DOGE from accessing the payments system. Hours later, a federal judge issued a preliminary injunction prohibiting DOGE from accessing data on the payment system and ordered any data downloaded by unauthorized people since January 20 to be destroyed. The judge scheduled a hearing for February 14. The judge in that hearing extended the injunction pending a later decision and a final ruling, which might take months.

DOGE said in February that it had discovered a tracking code was often missing in Treasury payments, rendering about $4.7 trillion in payments nearly impossible to trace. That figure would represent nearly 70% of total 2024 federal spending. Musk said he was told that over $100 billion in entitlements payments a year were being made without a Social Security number or a temporary identification number, and he was told that about $50 billion was "unequivocal and obvious fraud."

==== Bureau of the Fiscal Service (BFS) ====
A few weeks before Trump's inauguration, DOGE met with BFS officials and asked them how to stop payments; BFS distributes nearly all federal payments.

==== Bullion Depository (Fort Knox) ====
DOGE began efforts to gain physical access to the United States Bullion Depository at Fort Knox. As of 31 July 2020, Fort Knox holds 147.34 million troy ounces (4,583 metric tons) of gold reserves with a market value of US $290.9 billion, representing 56.35% of the gold reserves of the United States. Musk reportedly insisted on a "live video walkthrough" of the secure United States Army facility. Non-authorized personnel have only been given access to the gold depository three times in history, in 1943 for Franklin D. Roosevelt, in 1974 for members of Congress, and in 2017 for then-Treasury Secretary Steven Mnuchin and another Congressional delegation.

==== Internal Revenue Service (IRS) ====
On February 13, Sen. Ron Wyden announced that DOGE was at the Internal Revenue Service (IRS); an email was sent to the agency beforehand, asking officers to identify all "non-essential" contracts for termination. CNN reports that Gavin Kliger visited the agency and made a series of requests. Sources say that they included enforcement, personnel footprint, and extensive system access. Kliger would be named a senior advisor to the acting IRS commissioner.

By February 16, DOGE was seeking access to a highly sensitive and tightly controlled IRS system containing taxpayer information. In April, IRS committed to sharing data to support the DHS deportation effort.

6,700 probationary employees have been fired from the IRS, per order by Trump and DOGE. Elon Musk tweeted "deleted" in reference to the group behind the Direct File pilot and in April, it was announced the program will not continue.

DOGE members pressured IRS to hand over sensitive taxpayer data access to immigration agencies.

=== Transportation ===
Employees who give support to Starlink and SpaceX were spared from DOGE cuts.

==== Federal Aviation Administration (FAA) ====
In the wake of the 2025 Potomac River mid-air collision, United States secretary of transportation Sean Duffy announced on February 5 that DOGE would intervene with the Federal Aviation Administration (FAA) to "upgrade our aviation system". On February 17, transportation secretary Sean Duffy announced that 400 employees were fired. More than 130 of the eliminated workers held jobs that directly or indirectly support the air traffic controllers. DOGE arrived at the Federal Aviation Administration (FAA) on February 19, along SpaceX employees.

==== National Highway Traffic Safety Administration (NHTSA) ====
AP reported on April 12 that DOGE has started terminating workers at the NHTSA through firings, buyouts and layoffs. It noted that the NHTSA was investigating Tesla car crashes. The National Highway Traffic Safety Administration (NHTSA) laid off 4% of staff, according to a spokesperson. Critics and analysts have noted that The NHTSA did probes of Tesla for various complaints, including Tesla vehicles’ unexpected braking and loss of steering control.

=== Veterans Affairs ===
DOGE entered Department of Veterans Affairs (VA) in February 2025; internal reports revealed that DOGE was "data mining" disability compensation and benefits of United States Armed Forces veterans. The team includes Sahil Lavingia, Cary Volpert, Christopher Roussos, Justin Fulcher, Payton Rehling, and Jon Koval.

Documents obtained by ProPublica showed DOGE members detailed to VA in March were planning to close 17 or more hospitals, and introduce artificial intelligence tools to handle benefits claims; officials at various VA centers warned by email that DOGE contract terminations and staff downsizing were putting pressure on services, including to cancer patients.

By February 2025, dismissed over 1,000 probationary employees, including researchers focused on mental health, cancer treatments, addiction recovery, prosthetics, and burn pit exposure. By May, VA dismissed 2,500 workers and canceled more than 500 contracts. By July, VA had lost roughly 17,000 employees, and announced its goal of cutting a total of 30,000 by September, 2025.

== Independent agencies ==
=== Advisory Council on Historic Preservation (ACHP) ===
DOGE sent an email to onboard ACHP on April 17.

=== National Labor Relations Board (NLRB) ===
In April 2025 DOGE assigns staffers to work at agency where it allegedly removed sensitive data

=== AmeriCorps ===
In April 2025, DOGE has placed all of AmeriCorps leadership and 500 full-time federal workers on administrative leave with pay; remained 15% of its staff.

=== Consumer Financial Protection Bureau (CFPB) ===
The Consumer Financial Protection Bureau (CFPB) is responsible for consumer protection in the financial sector.

On November 27, 2024, Musk proposed eliminating the CFPB. On February 1, 2025, Trump agents fired CFPB Director Rohit Chopra. Chopra was replaced by Trump insider and Project 2025 advocate Russell Vought, who attempted to shutter and close the CFPB. Musk tweeted "CFPB RIP" on February 7. Concurrently, data and websites related to the CFPB were removed from the internet.

On February 14, 2025, U.S. District Judge Amy Berman Jackson commanded Donald Trump, Elon Musk and DOGE stand down on any attempts to reduce staffing, remove funding, delete any data, or otherwise interfere with operations of the CFPB. Berman Jackson's order specified that they "shall not delete, destroy, remove, or impair any data or other CFPB records" and "It is further ordered that Defendants shall not terminate any CFPB employee, except for cause." Multiple unions, groups and individuals filed a variety of lawsuits challenging any attacks on the CFPB, whose existence is governed and established in federal law by the Dodd–Frank Wall Street Reform and Consumer Protection Act, and can only be removed by changes in federal law.

On February 28, Wired reported that DOGE has put a $1 spending limit on the Smart Pay system at the agency.

On March 28, 2025, the judge issued a temporary injunction that ordered Trump administration to stop dismantling the CFPB and reinstate all terminated employees. Amy Berman Jackson wrote in the order, "There is a substantial risk that the defendants will complete the destruction of the agency completely in violation of law well before the Court can rule on the merits, and it will be impossible to rebuild."

=== Federal Communications Commission (FCC) ===
On April 4, there were three DOGE members at the independent agency: Tarak Makecha, Jordan Wick, and Jacob Altik.

=== Environmental Protection Agency (EPA) ===
By February 12, 2025, DOGE had entered the Environmental Protection Agency (EPA), with "read-only access to the EPA Acquisition System.

terminated over 300 probationary employees—including staff tasked with enforcing regulations under the Clean Air and Clean Water Acts and reviewing environmental permits—which could delay critical oversight functions and compromise timely responses to pollution and disaster events. In some regions, decisions were later partially reversed, highlighting administrative inconsistencies amid broader federal workforce cuts. During a cabinet meeting, President Trump said he expected 65% of the EPA workforce, nearly 11,000 employees, would be let go. Subsequently, EPA and Whitehouse spokespeople declined to reinforce this statement.

In March 2025, EPA staff members have been directed to submit to DOGE a one-page justification of any expense over $50,000 between 3 and 6 pm Eastern time, in addition to other paperwork normally used for expenses.

=== Federal Mediation and Conciliation Service (FMCS) ===
On March 26, the Guardian reported that DOGE shuttered the FMCS.

=== General Services Administration (GSA) ===
By inauguration day, DOGE was running the GSA. Stephen Ehikian sent an email on January 21 to GSA workers echoing the DOGE agenda. Wired reported "an effort to use IT credentials from the Executive Office of the President to access GSA laptops and internal GSA infrastructure". Workers at GSA's Technology Transformation Services (TTS) were summoned to meetings with young, inexperienced engineers who recently worked at Musk's companies. In the meetings, the TTS employees were required to present and defend code they had written. Some of the interviewers did not have government email addresses and refused to give their names. A Musk employee, Thomas Shedd, was appointed to lead TTS. Shedd told TTS employees to expect a reduction in staff. In mid-February, GSA laid off dozens of TTS employees, including technical staff in the Presidential Innovation Fellows and U.S. Digital Corps programs.

On January 20, Frank Schuler was sworn into the Trump Administration as a Senior Advisor to Stephen Ehikian, the Acting Administrator of the General Services Administration. Schuler was reportedly involved in coordinating with fellow DOGE member Nate Cavanaugh on certain government employee interviews. He was the President of a company that invested, developed, and syndicated real estate. Part of his past syndications included conservation easements, an area that has been controversial with the IRS for many years. Two weeks after Stephen Ehikian was appointed to head GSA, his brother Brad Ehikian submitted a bid to buy a 17-acre facility in Silicon Valley from GSA at a large discount. The GSA's inspector general is investigating "allegations of fraud, waste, abuse, and misconduct" in the attempted purchase.

Also on February 18, a long-time GSA employee resigned rather than be forced to give Thomas Shedd administrator access to Notify.gov, a government text message service that contains sensitive personal data for members of the public. It could have been a violation of the Federal Information Security Modernization Act to grant Shedd this access without a written justification and an update to the program's security plan; the GSA employee was "instructed to skip that process" by Shedd. On March 1, the entire 18F office was eliminated "under direction from the White House", weeks after Elon Musk claimed the "group was deleted." Musk and DOGE have also focused on the Public Building Service (PBS) as they target offices to RIF. 600 employees were laid off on March 3 and on March 5, in one of PBS regions, RIF notices were sent to 165 out of 178 employees. RIF notices have also been sent to some employees within the Office of Human Resources and the Office of Customer Experience.

On February 28, Wired reported that DOGE has put a $1 spending limit on the Smart Pay system at the agency.

In March, 2025, GSA briefly released a list of over 440 federal properties that could be sold off on the website. GSA has also sent out over 800 lease termination notices, followed by 117 letters rescinding some of them.

On March 20, 2025, GSA head Stephen Ehikian stated "there is no DOGE team at GSA" although a DOGE team including Davis has taken up offices at GSA, as required by the executive order establishing DOGE. Politico reported on March 6, 2025, that DOGE workers have set up at least four rooms for sleeping in the GSA building on 18th and F. The New York Times reports a number of DOGE members at GSA.

By summer 2025, hundreds of federal offices started to empty.

=== Institute of Museum and Library Services (IMLS) ===
DOGE staff met with agency leaders on March 20; the next days, organizations funded by the IMLS received notifications that their grants were terminated, effective immediately. Nearly all IMLS employees were put on leave.

=== Inter-American Foundation (IAF) ===
On March 3, DOGE announced on its social that it reduced IAF to one employee.

=== National Archives and Records Administration (NARA) ===
The National Archives and Records Administration is charged with the preservation and documentation of government and historical records. It is also tasked with increasing public access to those documents that make up the National Archives.

404 Media reported that, at an all-hands meeting of all NARA employees on February 4, Deputy Director Jay Bosanko stated that the agency had not received "any requests" from DOGE, that DOGE is not currently "looking to gain access" to National Archives systems, and stated there may be "unique opportunities to work with DOGE" to benefit the National Archives in the future.

=== National Endowment for the Humanities (NEH) ===
According to National Humanities Alliance, DOGE targeted the NEH on March 31.

Two days after it arrived, DOGE cut funding to Idaho Humanities Council, and with it the grant to restore the first movie made in Idaho.

=== National Science Foundation (NSF) ===
Science reported that DOGE entered the NSF on April 14; a few days later, the NSF announced the termination of $1 billion in grants it had already awarded. DOGE members Rachel Riley, former McKinsey consultant, Zachary Terrell and Luke Farritor were granted system access by April 22. On May 9, a memo was sent to announce reductions in force, plans to require in-person work, and the elimination of the Division of Equity for Excellence in STEM.

In June, 2025, it was announced that HUD would move into the NSF headquarters in DC with no plan for the existing NSF employees.

=== National Transportation Safety Board (NTSB) ===
On May 21, Reuters reported that DOGE had assigned a team to the NTSB to review its operations.

=== Office of Personnel Management (OPM) ===
DOGE entered the OPM on January 20, 2025, and locked workers out of their computer systems. They moved sofa beds into the fifth-floor director's office of the agency's headquarters.

On February 15, all of the OPM probationary staff (about 750 people) was terminated.

On February 22, an email from OPM's domain was sent to all federal employees asking what they accomplished in the past week. Several departments have instructed their employees to not respond to the email.

On February 28, Wired reported that DOGE had put a $1 spending limit on the Smart Pay system at the agency. around that time, employees in OPM's Human Capital Data Management and Modernization office, its privacy, Chief Technology Office and Freedom of Information Act office were also subject to RIFs.

On April 18, 2025, an innovation and human-centered design team, the Lab at OPM, working on government efficiency and tackling complex issues was eliminated.

==== Office of Procurement Operations ====
On February 21, OPM laid off nearly the entirety of the Office of Procurement Operations, presumably to transfer its functions to the GSA.

=== Peace Corps ===
Chief executive Allison Greene sent a second "fork in the road" buyout offer to its employees on April 28 after having received a DOGE assessment of the agency; DOGE member Bridget Youngs visited the headquarters and requested financial records.

=== Small Business Administration (SBA) ===
By mid-March, DOGE has terminated more than 25 contracts, and at least 22 leases at the SBA. It also changed the conditions for loans.

=== Securities and Exchange Commission (SEC) ===
In April 2025, it was reported that a DOGE team led by Eliezer Mishory was seeking information from the United States Securities and Exchange Commission. On July 1, Reuters reported that the SEC DOGE team was seeking to loosen regulations on SPACs and private investment advisers. The White House said that DOGE's actions within the SEC were intended to bring efficiency to the maintenance of fair markets and the protection of "everyday investors".

=== Selective Service System (SSS) ===
In April 2025, a spokesperson for the Selective Service System reportedly stated that, "A DOGE representative visited our Agency this week. We’ve established a great working relationship. They asked us about our data and requested access, which we gave in compliance with the President’s Executive Order on Establishing and Implementing the Department of Government Efficiency."

In December 2025, the SSS proposed to greatly expand the sharing of SSS registration data with other agencies, including for immigration enforcement.

=== Social Security Administration (SSA) ===
On the weekend of February 17, acting head of SSA Michelle King resigned after denying DOGE staffers access to private financial records of American citizens and Social Security recipients.

With Trump in the Oval Office days earlier, Musk asserted the SSA database included beneficiaries aged 150 years, later claiming that more than a million were aged 150 to 159, and dead people were collecting payments. Musk said the SSA could be "the biggest fraud in history." DOGE had misunderstood certain aspects of SSA operations, including how birth dates are handled on the antiquated COBOL-based computer system. Former SSA commissioner Martin O'Malley said the Musk allegations were false.

Nancy Altman, of advocacy group Social Security Works, said of the data access, "If there is an evil intent to punish perceived enemies, someone could erase your earnings record, making it impossible to collect the Social Security and Medicare benefits you have earned."

On February 25, 2025, SSA acting commissioner Leland Dudek announced that the agency was closing its Office of Civil Rights and Equal Opportunity, reassigning its statutory responsibilities to other offices. This office was closed by early March.

SSA also closed its Office of Transformation as of early March.

SSA acting Administrator Leland Dudek plans to lay off 7,000 employees in total.

After DOGE installed anti-fraud checks for claims made over phone, the SSA found only two suspicious cases over 110,000, while benefit processing was slowed by 25%. On Fox News, Musk said that 40% of phone claims were fraudulent. The SSA website and customer support channels have been crashing and overwhelmed since the DOGE cuts.

In August 2025, a whistleblower filed a complaint that DOGE uploaded a database of Americans' sensitive Social Security information to an unsecured server, compromising the data of millions of people.

DOGE's Social Security data-access lawsuit survived a dismissal attempt in June 2026, after a judge ruled the group's expiration didn't erase liability for past conduct. Plaintiffs disputed claims DOGE had left the SSA, noting two officials involved in granting it database access remained at the agency.

=== US Access Board ===
DOGE met with the United States Access Board by April 25.

=== US African Development Foundation (USADF) ===
DOGE entered USADF on March 6.

=== US Agency for International Development (USAID) ===
DOGE members entered the USAID's headquarters on January 27, accompanied by Pete Marocco, delegated by Marco Rubio. On February 1, DOGE members tried to gain access to classified information without sufficient security clearances. They were thwarted by security officials, who were put on leave the next day. DOGE then took the USAID website and social account offline, took over email accounts, fired staff, and stopped overseas work. On February 3, Gavin Kliger instructed USAID staff by email to keep away from USAID headquarters while hundreds of staff lost access to USAID computer systems. On February 9, Kliger (with Luke Farritor) disabled the accounts for the agency's staff; from then on, only DOGE could create or track payments.

On February 28, Wired reported that DOGE has put a $1 spending limit on the Smart Pay system at the agency.

In March, DOGE sent reduction in force notices to nearly all of its 2,000 US-based employees."

==== US Commission on Civil Rights (CCR) ====
At the end of May, DOGE operatives Nate Cavanaugh and Justin Aimonetti entered CCR.

=== US Interagency Council on Homelessness (USICH) ===
On April 16, NPR reported that USICH had been effectively shut down; after being named acting administrator, DOGE member Nate Cavanaugh put its staff on administrative leave.

=== US Postal Service (USPS) ===
On March 12, Louis DeJoy agreed with DOGE to cut billions of dollars and an additional 10,000 USPS workers from the independent federal agency, that cut following an earlier loss of 30,000 jobs in 2021. That agreement was reached a week after Elon Musk called for the privatization of the Postal Service. Four days later, on March 17, the agency leader reiterated "the status of the Postal Service as an independent establishment of the Executive Branch" in a letter to Congress. On March 24, exactly a week later, the 75th American Postmaster General resigned, making national news in politics.

== Government corporations ==
=== Millennium Challenge Corporation (MCC) ===
The MCC is a bilateral United States foreign aid agency established by the U.S. Congress in 2004. It is an independent agency separate from the State Department and USAID. It provides grants to countries that have been determined to have good economic policies and potential for economic growth.

In April 2025, members of DOGE had a series of meetings with MCC senior leadership. On April 23, 2025, MCC staff were informed that DOGE will shrink the organization and grants across the world within the next several months. According to reporting by the New York Times, it's anticipated that MCC will be reduced to the minimum required by law.

== Quasi-autonomous non-governmental organizations ==
Quasi-autonomous non-governmental organizations (quangos) are organizations to which a government has devolved power, but which is still partly controlled and/or financed by government bodies.

=== National Endowment for Democracy (NED) ===
On February 12, DOGE cut funding to NED by blocking disbursement from the Department of Treasury, causing significant disruptions to the organization. The same day, the NED informed the organizations it funds that it would suspend payments immediately. Additionally, organizations supported by NED started laying off staff and cutting expenditures. The Free Press believes that dismantling the NED would symbolise a momentous change in US foreign policy, undermining the idea that democratic ideals foster US global strength and influence, and that the Trump administration therefore no longer believes that promoting democracy in the world is in the national interest.

=== US Institute of Peace (USIP) ===
In March 2025, DOGE attempted to gain access to USIP headquarters to install a new president. After a day-long standoff, police forces escorted out USIP president George Moose. The Trump administration stated that it had fired a majority of the institute's board members and appointed Kenneth Jackson as president. On March 18, the USIP filed a lawsuit against the Trump administration, stating that the administration did not legally control the institute.

On May 30, TechCrunch reported that DOGE has left the USIP office with water damage, rats, and cockroaches. Cleaners also found marijuana.

=== Wilson Center ===
On March 31, DOGE entered the Wilson Center. DOGE member Justin Fox has been involved in meetings there.

== Regulatory independent agencies ==
=== Federal Trade Commission (FTC) ===
Chairman Paul Atkins confirmed that DOGE was at the FTC since May 20.

== Legislative agencies ==
=== Consumer Product Safety Commission (CPSC) ===
On May 7, the Acting Chair of the CPSC, Peter Feldman sought approval by email to bring in DOGE affiliates Justin Fox and Nate Cavanaugh, with a two-hour deadline. After this demand was refused, the Trump administration fired the three Democratic board members.

=== Government Accountability Office (GAO) ===
On May 16, DOGE sought to assign a team to the Government Accountability Office, from the legislative branch, which GAO officials refused.

=== Government Publishing Office (GPO) ===
On May 20, Politico reported that DOGE sought access to the GPO.

=== Library of Congress (LOC) ===
On May 12, Rep-D Joe Morelle accused DOGE members of requesting "unauthorized transfer of data" from LOC employees.

=== Office of Congressional Workplace Rights (OCWR) ===
On May 16, Politico reported that DOGE tried to access OCWR.

== See also ==
- Science policy of the second Donald Trump administration
