= Aram Moghaddassi =

American software engineer

- Born: February 1999 (age 27)
- Education: University of California, Berkeley (BA)
- Occupation: Engineer
- Known for: Neuralink; xAI; Department of Government Efficiency; Social Security Administration

Aram Moghaddassi is an American engineer who worked in the United States Federal Government within the Department of Government Efficiency (DOGE) and as CIO of the Social Security Administration (SSA). He previously worked at Neuralink, X Corp (formerly Twitter), and xAI.

== Early life and education ==
Moghaddassi graduated from Syosset High School in 2017. During high school, he competed in the Lincoln–Douglas debate format and was the 2017 New York State varsity champion.

In 2021, Moghaddassi graduated with a Bachelors Degree in Applied Mathematics from University of California, Berkeley. He was as an undergraduate researcher in Berkeley's Computational Cognitive Neuroscience Lab under Professor Anne Collins and was a summer research fellow at the Santa Fe Institute where he worked on the Hopfield Network. He also worked in Berkeley's Space Sciences Laboratory on the Cubesat Radio Interferometry Experiment funded by NASA.

== Career ==
=== Elon Musk companies ===
In January 2021, Moghaddassi began working at Neuralink as an Embedded Systems engineer. He is listed as an inventor on a 2022 patent filed by Neuralink for "Neural Signal Compression for Brain-Machine Interface".

In November 2022, Moghaddassi joined the Twitter Transition Team following the Acquisition of Twitter by Elon Musk. In March 2025, it was reported he was in the xAI org chart as an "xAI Partner".

=== DOGE ===
In February 2025, it was reported that Moghaddassi was part of a four person team that the Department of Government Efficiency planned to install at the Treasury Department. This team used payment systems at the Bureau of the Fiscal Service to block foreign aid payments issued by USAID, claiming these payments violated an executive order to pause all US foreign assistance despite push back from career officials.

In March 2025, Moghaddassi was interviewed by Bret Baier on Fox News, alongside Elon Musk and six other DOGE staffers (including Steve Davis, Joe Gebbia, and Tom Krause (business executive)). He spoke about modernizing government IT systems, reducing fraud, and improving customer experience at the SSA. Moghaddassi claimed that 40% of phone calls made to the agency for changing direct deposit information came from "fraudsters". In April 2025, SSA introduced a new policy which limited direct deposit changes over the phone due to concerns about identity fraud. This policy was disputed by a May 2025 internal SSA document obtained by NextGov which estimated a fraud rate of less than 1%, and said the new policy slowed claim processing by 25%. A September 2025 report from SSA's Inspector General found that 34% of direct deposit changes over the phone did not correctly verify the callers identity, and says the April phone policy "will help reduce the risk of 800-number employees inappropriately verifying the identities of callers before making direct deposit changes" and "requires stronger identity proofing and authentication for direct deposit changes."

In April 2025, it was reported Moghaddassi was working at the Department of Homeland Security on the "DOGE Immigration Task Force", led by Antonio Gracias. Moghaddassi had access to sensitive IT systems at United States Citizenship and Immigration Services where DOGE worked on the Systematic Alien Verification for Entitlements (SAVE) system. Moghaddassi was specifically linked to terminating the Social Security Numbers of ~6,300 parolees who either had criminal records or were on the FBI’s terrorist watchlist. Moghaddassi also held roles at the Department of Labor, Health and Human Services, and the Small Business Administration, with access to sensitive IT systems for labor visas, unemployment insurance, Medicare/Medicaid, SBA loans, and grants/contracts management.

On March 15, 2025, Moghaddassi wrote to SSA officials that his granted access to the United States Department of Homeland Security (DHS)'s SAVE data system was "absolutely critical to get detailed immigration status for non-citizen SSNs to detect fraud and improper payments". Later that same week, Moghaddassi wrote to Ron DeSantis from a DHS email account asking for access to the state's voting data.

On September 25, 2026, the Supreme Court of the United States granted a stay allowing the expanded SAVE program to continue operating, overruling the decision of a lower court.

==== SSA ====
On March 19, 2025, the American Federation of State, County and Municipal Employees sued regarding DOGE's access to IT systems at the Social Security Administration. Moghaddassi and Antonio Gracias were included by name along with 10 other anonymous DOGE SSA staff members. The plaintiffs were granted a temporary restraining order blocking DOGE's access, but this decision was later overturned in June by the Supreme Court of the United States and DOGE was consequently granted full access to SSA systems.

After the Supreme Court lifted the ban, DOGE transferred a live copy of the country's Social Security database into a cloud server without independent security controls, which was authorized by Moghaddassi. Moghaddassi was formally appointed to be Chief Information Officer at the Social Security Administration that same month.

In August 2025, Moghaddassi was included in a whistleblower complaint, which alleged that DOGE uploaded the Numident database to an insecure cloud server, compromising the data of millions of people. The report was filed by the chief data officer of the SSA, accusing Moghaddassi of "violating agency policies to 'create a live copy of the country’s Social Security information in a cloud environment that circumvents oversight,' in violation of multiple federal statutes". SSA commissioner Frank Bisignano denied these allegations in a public letter to the chair of Senate Finance Committee Mike Crapo. Despite attempt to dispute these claims, the agency confessed in a notice of corrections filed on January 16, 2026 that DOGE staffers had access to sensitive information that it had previously denied. The information was traded amongst DOGE staffers and transferred to a non-Social Security server, which is now inaccessible to the agency. Furthermore, these transfers occurred while a federal court order barred DOGE from any data access.

== See also ==
- Network of the Department of Government Efficiency
- Elon Musk
- Antonio Gracias
- Tom Krause (business executive)
- Joe Gebbia
- Steve Davis (executive)
- Frank Bisignano
- Edward Coristine
