= Épater la bourgeoisie =

French phrase

Épater la bourgeoisie or épater le (or les) bourgeois is a French phrase that became a rallying cry for the French Decadent poets of the late 19th century including Charles Baudelaire and Arthur Rimbaud. It means "to shock or scandalize the (respectable) middle classes".

The expression is first found in a book by French author Alexandre Privat d’Anglemont, a friend of Baudelaire. The Decadent poets, fascinated as they were with hashish, opium, and absinthe, found, in Joris-Karl Huysmans' novel À rebours (1884), an eccentric hero who secludes himself in his house, basking in life-weariness or ennui, far from the bourgeois society that he despises.

== See also ==
- Cubism
- Deviance
- Edgelord
- Flash mob
- Grotesque
- Owning the libs
- Punk rock
- Shock value
