= Owned (slang) =

Slang word

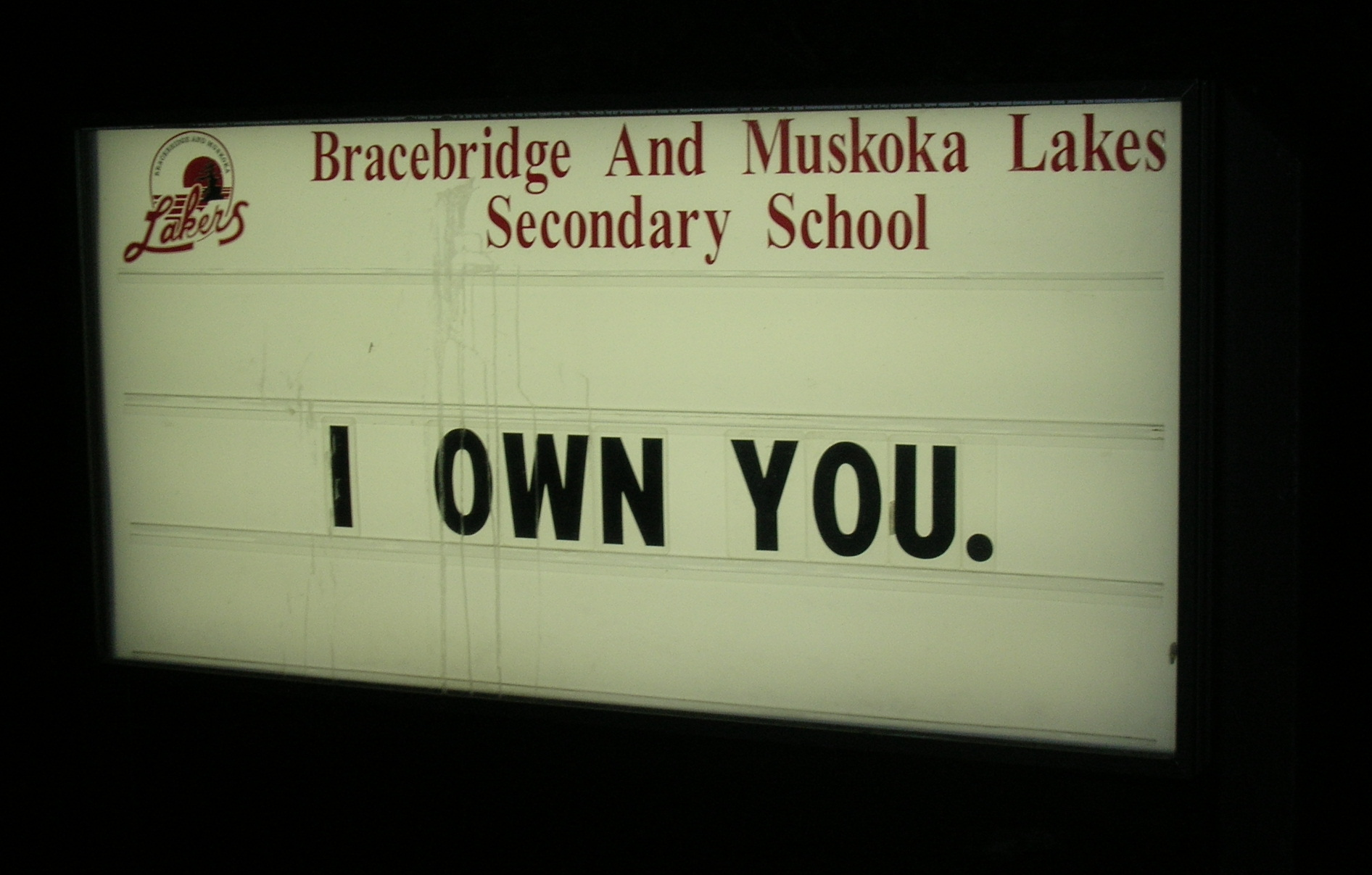
A message from an "ownage" hacker

Owned is a slang word that originated in the 1990s among hackers where it referred to "rooting" or gaining administrative control over someone else's computer. The term eventually spread to gamers, who used the term to mean defeat in gaming. Other variations of the word owned include own3d, 0wn3d, pwned, pwnt, POWER OWNED and pooned, terms which incorporate elements of leetspeak.

In 2009, Newgrounds described a security vulnerability in ActiveX as leaving Windows XP and Windows 2003 Server users open to a "Browse-And-Get-Owned" attack.

Owned has now spread beyond computer and gaming contexts and become part of standard slang, especially in social media, and is typically used to signify severe defeat or humiliation, usually in an amusing way or through the dominance of an opposing party, in diverse contexts ranging from sports to politics (e.g. "Obama owns Fox News" or "Trump owns CNN").

== Origins ==
The Jargon File, a historical glossary of computer slang, defines the hacker usage of owned as "your condition when your machine has been cracked by a root exploit, and the attacker can do anything with it."

The term's original usage was close to that of the traditional meaning of the word own – for instance, "I owned the network at MIT" indicated that the speaker had cracked the servers and had the same root-level privileges that the legitimate owner of the servers had. By 1997, owned appeared in text illicitly added to websites in website defacements.

== Usage in gaming ==
The term "owned" subsequently spread to gaming circles, where it was used to refer to defeat in a game. For example, if a player makes a particularly impressive kill shot or wins a match by an appreciable margin in a multiplayer video game, it is not uncommon for him or her to say owned to the loser(s), as a manifestation of victory, a taunt, or provocation. Ownage has become a modern equivalent to "turkey shoot"; applicable when an experienced faction predictably annihilates a beginner or disadvantaged faction. In slang form, owned can be an adjective (He is owned), owning can be a verb (He is totally owning that guy.), and ownage can be a noun.

The phrase "own" can not only refer to defeating one particular player or team, but it can also be used to indicate total domination of the competition. The racing video game Need for Speed: Nitro follows this definition by awarding a special bonus called "Own it", in which a player earns points for every second they spend in first place, while also expressing their dominance visually to other opponents by painting every portion of the course where they lead with their tag and colors.

== Usage in politics ==
In the late 2010s, the concept of ownage (specifically, "owning the libs") has become a defining ethos of right-wing politics in the United States. Ben Shapiro describes the concept in the National Review:

Here's the process for how to own a lib, by the current logic: First, you say something that "triggers the libs"; then, when they make clear that they're triggered, you mock them; then, by virtue of your mockery, you own them. What you choose to do with the libs you own is irrelevant; mere pride of ownership is the important thing.

In other words, Republicans and conservatives may often prioritize opportunities to make Democrats and liberals feel bad, sometimes to a greater degree than actual policy achievement. Statements intended to upset liberals tend to be about topics known as culture war issues.

This pugilistic style of politics is especially popular with Donald Trump and his supporters. However, it is a controversial practice inside and outside the Republican party. For example, Nikki Haley said "I know that it's fun and that it can feel good, but step back and think about what you're accomplishing when you do this—are you persuading anyone?"
