= Amy Gleason =

American healthcare executive (born 1971/1972)

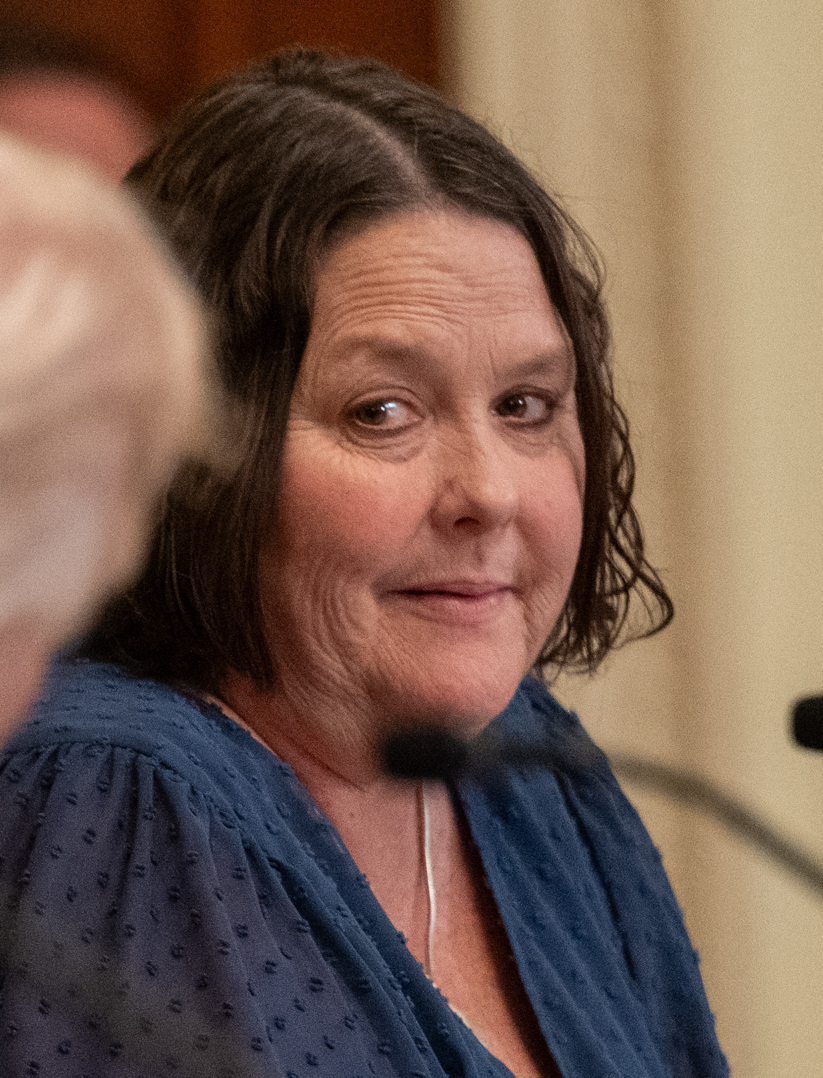
- Gleason in 2025

Acting Administrator of the United States DOGE Service
- Incumbent
- Assumed office c. February 2025
- President: Donald Trump
- Preceded by: Mina Hsiang (as the United States Digital Service)

Personal details
- Born: 1971 or 1972 (age 54–55)
- Children: 1
- Education: University of Tennessee

Amy Gleason (born 1971 or 1972) is an American healthcare executive and former nurse who has served as the acting administrator of the United States DOGE Service since 2025.

Gleason worked as an emergency room nurse until 2010, when she quit her job after her daughter was diagnosed with juvenile myositis. She co-founded CareSync in 2011 and served as its chief operating officer. After the company abruptly shut down, she began working for the United States Digital Service as a digital services expert in October 2018. Gleason left the Digital Service in December 2021. Gleason served as the chief product officer of Main Street Health.

In December 2024, Gleason rejoined the United States Digital Service as part of the Department of Government Efficiency. In February 2025, an official in the Trump administration stated that Gleason had been serving as the acting administrator of the United States DOGE Service. Her role as administrator was largely assumed by Steve Davis; Gleason focused on technology at the United States Department of Health and Human Services.

== Early life and education ==
Gleason was born in 1971 or 1972. She is a graduate of the University of Tennessee.

== Career ==
=== Early work and healthcare executive (1993–2018) ===
Gleason worked as an emergency room nurse but quit her job after her daughter was diagnosed with juvenile myositis in 2010. She worked at Veradigm, then known as Allscripts. Gleason co-founded CareSync in 2011 and served as its chief operating officer. Additionally, Gleason served as the vice president of research for the Cure JM Foundation from 2014 to 2018. She spoke about her daughter's condition in a TEDx event in Boston in April 2020. Gleason studied gamification at the University of Pennsylvania. She founded a consultancy business, Gleason Strategies, in Florida. In 2015, the Obama administration named Gleason as one of nine "Champions of Change for Precision Medicine".

=== United States Digital Service (2018–2021) ===
In October 2018, after CareSync abruptly shut down, Gleason joined the United States Digital Service as a digital services expert. Her work involved improving technology systems at the Centers for Disease Control and Prevention and the Centers for Medicare and Medicaid Services. She was a member of the White House Coronavirus Task Force's data team and worked on SimpleReport, a COVID-19 reporting system by the Centers for Disease Control and Prevention. Concurrently, Gleason studied healthcare management at Pasco-Hernando State College from 2018 to 2019. She left the Digital Service in December 2021.

=== Post-government work (2021–2024) ===
After leaving the United States Digital Service, Gleason served as the chief product officer of Main Street Health and worked with Russell Street Ventures.

== Acting Administrator of the United States DOGE Service (2025–present) ==
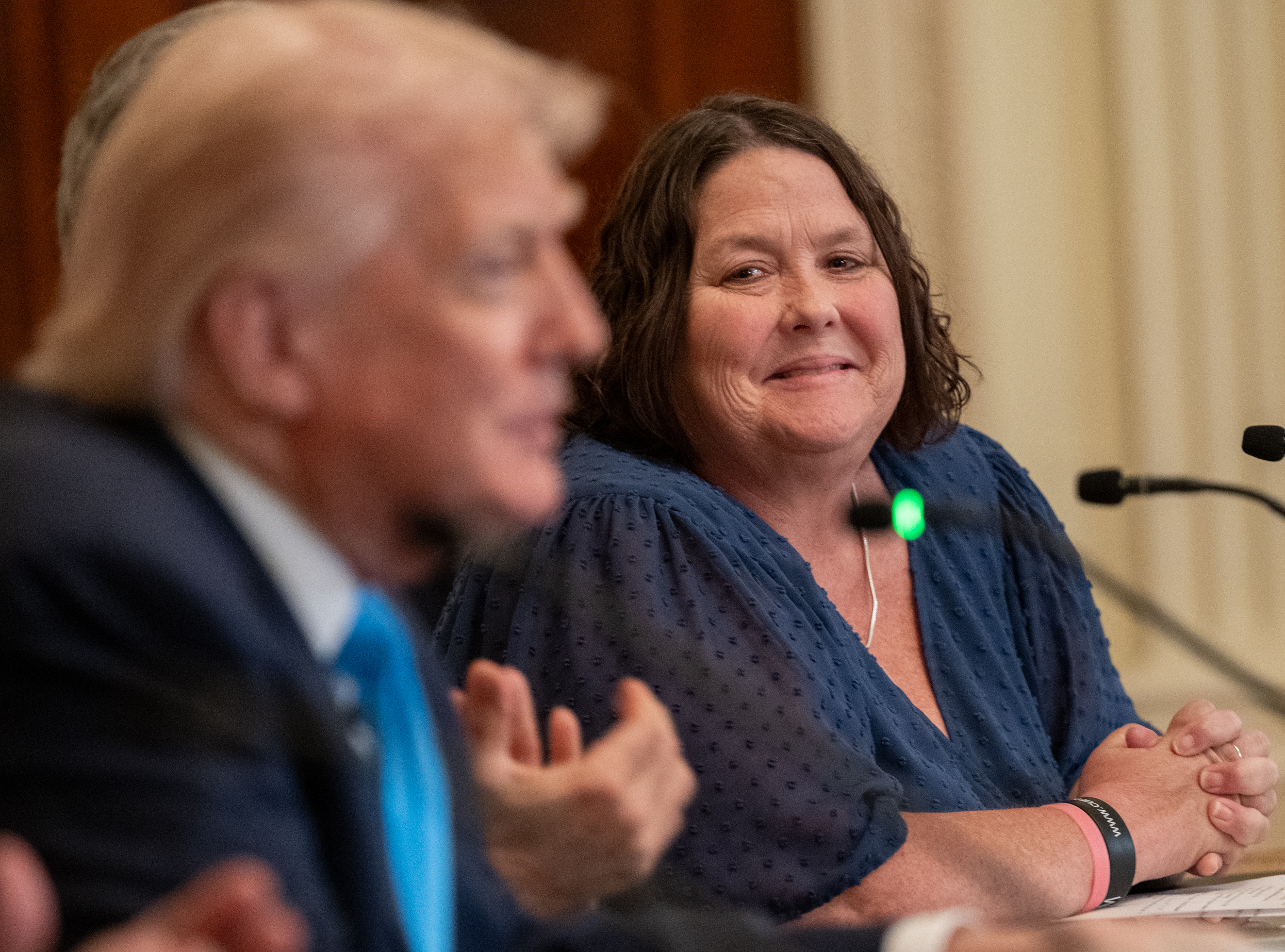
Gleason (right) with President Donald Trump (left) in July 2025

In December 2024, Brad Smith, the founder of Russell Street Ventures, began advising Elon Musk on the Department of Government Efficiency. On December 30, Gleason rejoined the United States Digital Service; the following month, she began regularly consulting with Smith and Steve Davis on the Department of Government Efficiency. Gleason oversaw the transition of the United States Digital Service into the United States DOGE Service, including the agency's move from the Office of Management and Budget to the Executive Office of the President of the United States. She publicly identified her role as a senior advisor at the United States Digital Service in January. In the final weeks of the Biden administration, Gleason recommended three Digital Service applicants, including Luke Farritor. By February, Gleason was assisting officials at the Centers for Medicare and Medicaid Services.

On February 25, an official in the Trump administration stated that Gleason had been serving as the acting administrator of the United States DOGE Service, though the Department of Government Efficiency was effectively led by Elon Musk. Gleason's involvement in DOGE's actions was not known. The beginning of Gleason's tenure is unclear; a lawyer for the Department of Justice told a federal judge that he was "not able to get an answer" on who led the United States DOGE Service prior to the announcement, but definitively stated that it was not Musk. On February 18, Gleason, joined by Kendall Lindemann, met with United States DOGE Service employees who joined the agency as the United States Digital Service. She was viewed by employees as a liaison between existing employees, DOGE employees, and other government agencies.

Despite leading the United States DOGE Service, Gleason was distanced from its operations; her responsibilities were largely assumed by Davis. In February, she was detailed to the United States Department of Health and Human Services and formally hired on March 4. That month, the Centers for Medicare and Medicaid Services stated that Gleason was leading efforts to modernize data and IT systems at the agency. Gleason's work involved modernizing Medicare and Medicaid. She led a plan to standardize data-sharing between the federal government and companies. Gleason later called for a larger federal workforce and greater access to patient data.
