= Gavin Kliger =

American software engineer

- Occupation: Chief Data Officer at the United States Department of Defense.

Gavin Kliger is an American software engineer and government official who was the chief data officer at the United States Department of Defense. A 2020 graduate of UC Berkeley in electrical engineering and computer science, he previously worked as a software engineer at Databricks before entering public service in January 2025 as part of the second Trump administration's Department of Government Efficiency (DOGE). As a DOGE operative, Kliger was deployed across multiple federal agencies including USAID, the CFPB, the IRS, the USDA, the USAGM, and the FTC. At the Department of Defense, he oversaw the launch of GenAI.mil and contributed to the Drone Dominance Program before being named Chief Data Officer in March 2026.

== Education and career ==
Kliger attended UC Berkeley, graduating in 2020. Kliger's LinkedIn lists him as later working as a software engineer at Databricks.

On February 2, 2025, Wired reported Kliger was among a group of 19- to 24-year-old engineers to be appointed to the Department of Government Efficiency (DOGE). The same day, Kliger posted an article in his online newsletter titled "Why DOGE: Why I gave up a seven-figure salary to save America".

Before 1:00 AM on February 3, 2025, Kliger sent an email from a United States Agency for International Development (USAID) email address to all USAID employees ordering them to work from home, and not to come into the office. Kliger has no prior experience at the agency or in government. The move was criticized by USAID personnel and Democratic politicians, including Senator Chris Coons, who described the Trump administration as "trying to gut the agency altogether."

On February 6, Consumer Financial Protection Bureau (CFPB) staff were told by email that DOGE members (including Kliger) entered the agency building and would require access to CFPB data, systems, and equipment. Kliger was warned about potential conflicts of interest arising from his stock portfolio containing a number of companies which would potentially benefit from any mass layoffs at the CFPB and advised to divest from those positions. Kliger declined to divest his positions, including ones where divestment would be mandatory for a CFPB employee. Kliger was accused of yelling at CFPB staff he kept for a 36-hour shift. A mass firing in mid April attempted to reduce the bureau's headcount by approximately 86%, but it has been halted in court. Kliger conducted the mass layoffs, which included the ethics lawyers who warned him against financial conflicts of interest.

In February 2025, Kliger began working at the United States Department of Agriculture (USDA), where he worked directly with Secretary Brooke Rollins to carry out the DOGE agenda. Court documents revealed that USDA officials drafted agency-wide guidance directing staff to identify and terminate climate-related grants at Kliger's direction, with a policy lead emailing the agency's deputy chief financial officer to ask whether a draft "encapsulate[d] what Gavin is looking for." Kliger approved the guidance with revisions and pushed the agency to exceed an initial target of $120 million in climate grant cuts, while also suggesting AI tools he was developing could be deployed to accelerate the review process across agencies. By March 2025, USDA had terminated over $1.2 billion in federal awards. The USDA subsequently cancelled all grants under its Food for Progress foreign aid program in May 2025, terminating awards affecting agricultural development projects in multiple countries, as part of broader DOGE-directed spending cuts at the agency.

In February 2025, Kliger became the first DOGE representative to arrive at the Internal Revenue Service (IRS). On the same day, President Trump confirmed the review at an Oval Office press conference, saying of DOGE: "The Internal Revenue Service will be looked at like everybody else... They're doing a helluva job." Kliger served as the lead DOGE representative at the IRS for a 120-day detail, subsequently joined by fellow DOGE member Sam Corcos. During his tenure, the IRS workforce was reduced by approximately 25,000 employees through layoffs, voluntary buyouts, early retirements, and attrition — a roughly 25% reduction — according to a report by the Treasury Inspector General for Tax Administration. Despite the scale of the reductions, the National Taxpayer Advocate's mid-year report to Congress found the 2025 filing season to be "one of the most successful filing seasons in recent memory," with the IRS processing nearly 141 million individual income tax returns. Kliger and Corcos also developed plans to modernize IRS data infrastructure, including a proposed API to integrate the agency's databases. His detail ended on April 17, 2025.

Around March 1, 2025, Kliger was detailed to the US Agency for Global Media (USAGM) and was spotted inside Voice of America headquarters by sources who informed Axios. His presence came approximately two weeks before the Trump administration placed over 1,000 USAGM employees on administrative leave on March 15, effectively shutting down Voice of America for the first time since its founding in 1942. The dismantling of USAGM prompted multiple federal lawsuits; in May 2025 the D.C. Circuit Court of Appeals stayed a preliminary injunction that had ordered USAGM to restore employees and reinstate grant funding to Radio Free Asia and Middle East Broadcasting Networks. In March 2026, a federal judge ruled that actions taken by USAGM senior advisor Kari Lake in a leadership capacity had violated federal law, voiding the staff reductions she oversaw.

In April, Kliger began work at the Federal Trade Commission (FTC).

Beginning in December 2025, Kliger joined the Department of Defense's DOGE team, where he contributed to the launch of GenAI.mil, the department's official enterprise AI platform, which reached one million unique users within two months of its launch. He contributed to the Drone Dominance Program, which focused on rapidly fielding American-made, one-way attack drones to the military. On March 6, 2026, the Department announced Kliger's appointment as chief data officer, a role described as placing him at the center of the Department's most ambitious AI efforts, focused on day-to-day alignment of AI projects and direct coordination with frontier AI laboratories. His appointment came days after the Department designated Anthropic as a supply chain risk, following Anthropic's refusal to permit unrestricted military use of its Claude AI model for autonomous weapons and mass surveillance applications.

In 2026, Kliger co-founded the military cyber startup Cathedral along with former DOGE staffers Luke Farritor, Marko Elez and Jack Stein. The company made news in October 2026 when it announced that it successfully broke it to software at Anthropic.

== Personal life ==
In the context of his employment by the government, concerns have been raised about his amplification of extremist viewpoints including reposting content from white supremacist Nick Fuentes and misogynistic social media influencer Andrew Tate. The Daily Beast described his online presence as that of an edgelord.

== See also ==
- Network of the Department of Government Efficiency
