= Owning the libs =

Strategy of American conservatives

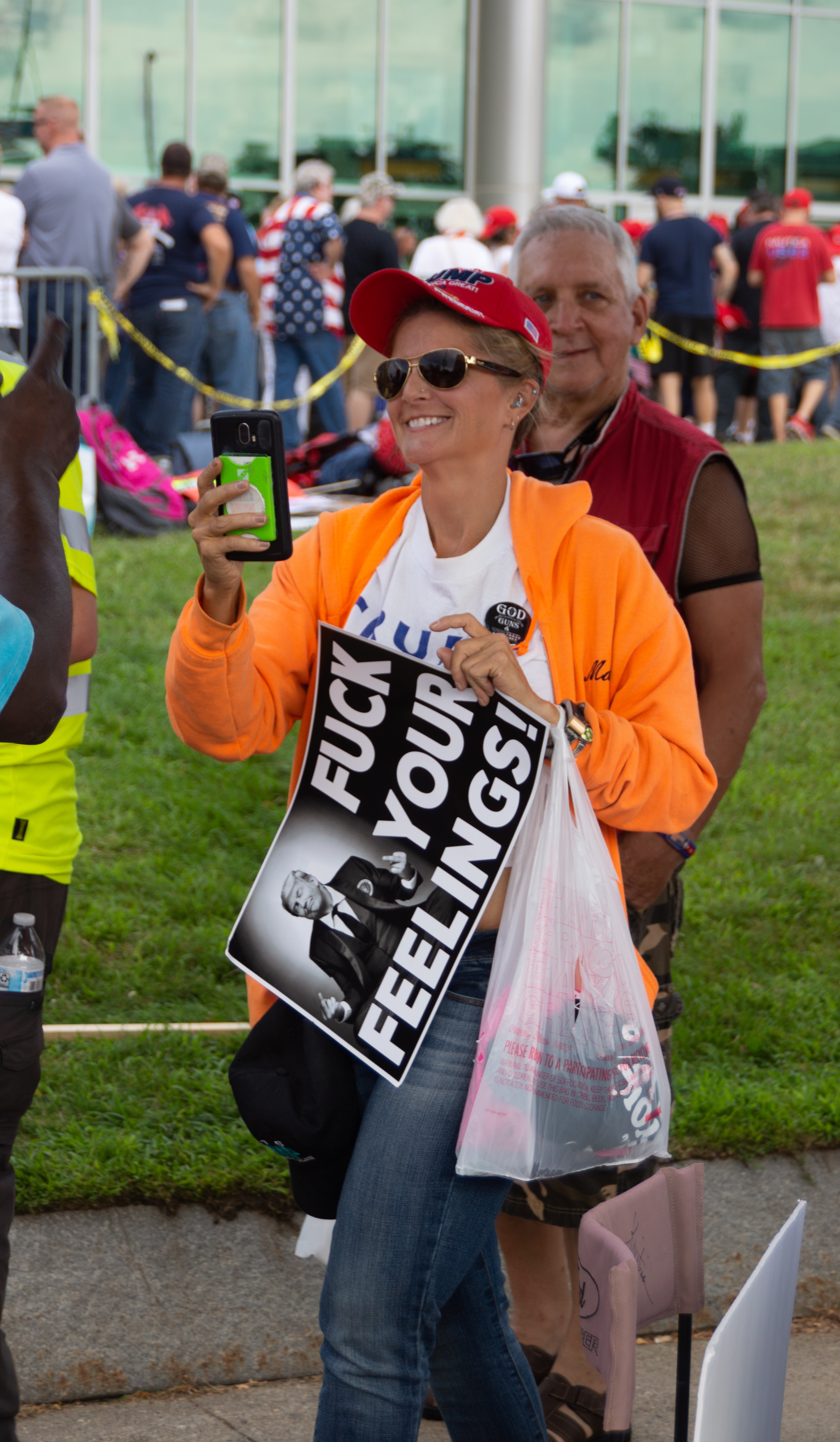
A "fuck your feelings" sign at a pro-Trump campaign rally in 2019

"Owning the libs" (or variations on this phrase) names a rhetorical device that transgresses political correctness and emphasizes culture war issues to provoke a reaction in others, similar to trolling. It has become a common trope among conservatives in the United States to mock American liberals and mobilize its base.

== Terminology ==
The phrase "own the libs" comes from a slang usage of the word "own", meaning "to dominate," "to defeat," or, "to humiliate." Variant phrases such as "triggering the libs" and "melting snowflakes" are also used to refer to the strategy. The phrase was coined and popularized by critics of the strategy, including politician Nikki Haley, who increased the prominence of the phrase in a 2018 speech in which she criticized the strategy as unpersuasive. It was also used by some who practice the strategy, such as former Fox News host Dan Bongino. The phrase dates back to at least 2015.

The "trigger" variants of the phrase come from the concept of trauma triggers and "trigger warnings" intended to avoid them. In his 2019 book Triggered, Donald Trump Jr. says that the purpose of triggering liberals is to oppose political correctness. The strategy is associated with confrontational political slogans such as "fuck your feelings" and "make liberals cry again."

== History ==
Beginning in the 1980s, conservative talk radio hosts such as Rush Limbaugh eschewed the intellectualism of earlier conservatives like William F. Buckley, instead using a more aggressive and confrontational rhetorical style that frequently employed ad hominems, taunting and hyperbole to attack liberal ideas.

Conservative student activist groups like Turning Point USA and remixes of campus speakers like Ben Shapiro played a key role in developing the strategy during the 2000s and 2010s. The 2008 vice presidential campaign of Sarah Palin was a precursor to the owning the libs method, according to former Republican strategist and Lincoln Project co-founder Rick Wilson. Palin marked a merger between politics and entertainment, causing an anxiety among educated elites that her voters found thrilling. Wilson says owning the libs assuages insecurities of people on the American political right, and has become central to the Republican Party because of its success at this. More recently, the strategy is associated with President Donald Trump and his son Donald Trump Jr. The method was adopted by the alt-right and alt-lite as a form of trolling and antagonism in the mid/late 2010s.

== Goals ==
Far-right conspiracy theorist Jacob Wohl has stated that the goal in owning the libs is to evoke in people "the type of unhinged emotional response that you would expect out of somebody who is suffering a serious mental episode." The strategy uses trolling to portray political opponents as weak, biased, or overtly emotional, and to portray oneself as superior because of a lack of emotion. Users of the strategy sometimes seek to be deplatformed in order to gain notoriety.

Rutgers University media scholar Khadijah White says the strategy serves to excuse corruption from one's political allies by portraying one's opponents as equally corrupt. Shared enjoyment of owning the libs maintains group cohesion among a conservative voting bloc, according to Nicole Hemmer of Columbia University. Hemmer views the strategy as a substitute for the cohesive conservative ideology that existed during the Cold War.

The phrase "the cruelty is the point" was coined from the title of Adam Serwer's 2018 article in The Atlantic about Trump supporters building community together by delighting in the suffering of those they consider outsiders. The phrase and the observation about shared joy in cruelty have been written about in the media as the purpose of owning the libs.

Art critic Ben Davis has written that the painter Jon McNaughton's stated goal of creating work that "triggers the left" undersells the sincerity of his work. McNaughton's paintings communicate a "real and popular viewpoint" sincerely held by conservative or reactionary consumers of art, even as the paintings also function as memes intended to upset perceived political enemies.

== Criticism ==
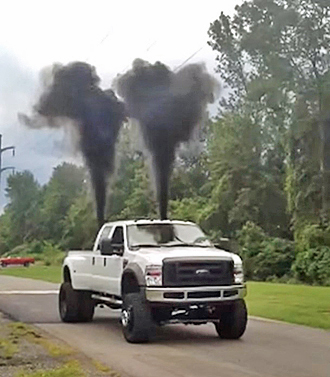
A Ford F-450 "rolling coal"

The strategy of owning the libs has been criticized by both liberal and conservative observers as an unsuccessful strategy, or as leading only to counterproductive Pyrrhic victory.

At a 2018 Turning Point USA event, Republican Nikki Haley remarked:

Raise your hand if you've ever posted anything online to quote-unquote own the libs. I know that it's fun and that it can feel good, but step back and think about what you're accomplishing when you do this. Are you persuading anyone? Who are you persuading? We've all been guilty of it at some point or another, but this kind of speech isn't leadership. It's the exact opposite.

In her book Troll Nation, Amanda Marcotte argues that owning the libs is so central to the political right that any effort to show care and concern for the well-being of others, or even for oneself, is viewed as suspiciously liberal. She gives the example of rolling coal, the practice of illegally modifying a diesel pickup truck to produce clouds of black smoke. Exhaust from rolling coal is sometimes directed at drivers of fuel-efficient cars and cyclists, in order to offend their presumed liberal environmentalist values. Marcotte argues that rolling coal has no value outside of trolling liberals. It costs the coal-roller money, increases fuel consumption, can void the warranty of their vehicle, and may violate air-pollution laws. Hence, Marcotte argues, rolling coal is an expensive and counterproductive way to misconstrue environmentalism as an identity marker instead of a policy matter.

In 2020, Paul Waldman opined that "hatred of liberals is all that's left of conservatism." He argues that owning the libs has pushed aside all policy goals previously central to Republicans, such as small government and lower taxes, as well as Republican commitment to democracy and patriotism. Waldman gives the example of the Texas v. Pennsylvania lawsuit and the physical violence threatened against Republicans who refused to join the suit.

== See also ==
- Cutting off one's nose to spite one's face
- Dirtbag left
- Edgelord
- Épater la bourgeoisie
- Schadenfreude
