= Justin Fox (DOGE employee) =

American businessman

Justin Fox is an American businessman who served in the Department of Government Efficiency (DOGE). Fox, along with DOGE employee Nate Cavanaugh, terminated 97% of grants administered under the National Endowment for the Humanities (NEH), and is the subject of a lawsuit filed in 2026. Fox was an employee of the General Services Administration and a member of the DOGE Small Agencies Team.

== Career ==
Fox previously worked for Jefferies, and later Nexus Capital Management.

=== Second Trump administration ===
Fox joined DOGE in early March 2025, and shortly was assigned to aid DOGE at the US African Development Foundation. Fox was also assigned to the National Labor Relations Board.

On March 12, 2025, Fox was subsequently detailed at the National Endowment for the Humanities under Nate Cavanaugh. Fox was tasked with tagging NEH grants for "DEI", and used ChatGPT to identify such grants. Fox compiled a list he described as the "craziest" and "other bad" grants, using three dozen keywords including "equality", "LGBT", and "immigration". In 22 days, 97% of grants were cancelled, including a grant for High Point Museum to conduct HVAC repairs.

Fox was deposed as part of a lawsuit filed by American Council of Learned Societies, the American Historical Association, and the Modern Language Association. The video of Fox's deposition subsequently went viral. In a widely shared clip from the deposition, Fox was asked if he agreed with ChatGPT's flagging of a documentary about Jewish slave labor during the Holocaust, responding "It's a Jewish — specifically focused on Jewish culture and amplifying the marginalized voices of the females in that culture. It's inherently related to D.E.I. for that reason." Fox also struggled to define DEI.

According to a March 13, 2026 filing, the US government asked that the videos be removed "from the internet due to concerns that the publication of the videos could subject the witnesses and their family members to undue harassment and reputational harm," adding "Unfortunately, that risk has now materialized—at least one witness has been subjected to significant harassment, including death threats. Accordingly, we respectfully request that the Court enter the requested order as soon as possible to minimize the risk of additional harm to the witnesses and their families."

On March 13, 2026, judge Colleen McMahon of the Federal District Court in Manhattan ordered the viral videos of Fox and Cavanaugh's depositions to be taken down, ordering the scholarly groups "take any and all possible steps to claw back” the videos.

On March 23, the judge rescinded that order, saying the public interest in the videos outweighs the risk of "embarrassment and reputational harm." The judge added, "the videos concern the conduct of public officials acting in their official capacities — a context in which the public interest in transparency and accountability is at its apex."

In May 2026, Judge McMahon ordered the restoration of the NEH grants in a ruling that criticized Cavanaugh's and Fox's use of ChatGPT in the cancellation of the funding.

=== Private sector ===
On April 18, 2026, Wired published an investigation titled "Where the DOGE Operatives Are Now". According to the investigation, both Fox and his former superior Nate Cavanaugh have returned to the private sector and work together at Special, an AI startup.
