= Steve Davis (executive) =

Department of Government Efficiency employee

Senior Advisor to the United States DOGE Service
- In office 20 January 2025 – 29 May 2025
- President: Donald Trump
- Administrator: Amy Gleason (from 18 February 2025)

Personal details
- Education: University of Pennsylvania (BAS, BS); Durham University (MS); Stanford University (MS); George Mason University (PhD)

Steven M. Davis (born 1979 or 1980) is a business executive. In early 2025, he was the effective leader of the United States Department of Government Efficiency (DOGE). Davis is president of the Boring Company.

The New York Times characterized Davis as Elon Musk's "top lieutenant", having played many roles within Musk's enterprises, particularly focused on cost cutting, firing, and dismantling organizations. Musk has compared him to chemotherapy.

== Education ==
Davis graduated in 1997 from Sharon High School in Sharon, Massachusetts, where he was on the student government. He then earned a Bachelor of Applied Science in mechanical engineering from the University of Pennsylvania and a Bachelor of Science in economics from the university's Wharton School in 2001. He went on to earn a Master of Science (M.S.) in particle physics from Durham University in 2002 and a second Master of Science in aerospace engineering from Stanford University in 2003. A 2008 NASA biography describes both bachelor's degrees as summa cum laude and the Durham degree as earned with distinction. He joined SpaceX in 2003 after graduating. While working at SpaceX and living in Washington DC, he obtained a Ph.D. in economics from George Mason University; he wrote his 2010 dissertation on U.S. currency debasement, under Richard E. Wagner.

== Career ==
=== SpaceX ===
Davis began working for Elon Musk in 2003 at SpaceX, where he was the 14th hire. He was hired from the Stanford University graduate aeronautics program. He worked on the guidance navigation and the control system of the Falcon 1, which he says "is a fancy way of saying make sure the rocket goes straight when it takes off". He was Lead Systems Engineer for SpaceX Dragon. In 2008, he was appointed to Director of advanced projects, and moved to Washington, D.C. where he was closer to NASA.

=== Frozen Yogurt Stores ===
While in Washington, Davis and some friends noted the lack of frozen yogurt stores in the city, and being a fan of the dessert opened one of its first shops, Mr. Yogato. He ran Mr. Yogato, as a side hustle, from 2008 to 2018. Davis, who wanted to create a "fun place", made up rules so that clients could earn a discount, for instance reciting the Braveheart speech or dressing up like Bjorn Borg or singing "I'm Too Sexy" with a Swedish accent. Davis in 2013 also opened a bar in Washington called Thomas Foolery, another "fun place" concept. It had gimmicks including selling liquor in mini-bottles, a bar menu of grilled cheese and peanut butter and jelly sandwiches, and a candy dispensary. Each table had a board game, and the interior design was a kindergarten room decor for adults. The bar was one of the first places in DC to accept bitcoins. In late 2018, with the shop's lease ending and little time to devote to it, he sold Mr. Yogato for $1.

=== Boring Company ===
In 2018, Musk appointed Davis to lead the Boring Company. At Boring, Davis gained a reputation for frugality, signing off on costs as low as a few hundred dollars at a company that had raised about $800 million.

=== Twitter ===
After the acquisition of Twitter in 2022, Davis moved into the company's headquarters with his wife and newborn baby. He was effectively a chief operating officer, along with James Musk (Elon's cousin) and Jared Birchall, who were responsible for cutting staff and expenses. Davis was responsible for the decision to charge for API access.

Davis was tasked with reviewing finances at the San Francisco headquarters. One employee described him as "the grim reaper who only shows up for bad things." Davis asked the former vice-president of real estate to "find" $500 million in savings; when told that lease terminations incur fees, Davis said: "We just won't pay those [...] We just won't pay rent." According to a lawsuit by former Twitter security head Alan Rosa, Davis gave him the ultimatum to "cut the physical security budget by an additional 50 percent by midnight"; Rosa alleged that after he objected (citing court orders), Twitter fired him and withheld his severance package while investigating his conduct. Rosa's complaint also alleged that Davis did not want to pay for software needed to comply with Twitter's FTC consent decree. Davis was tasked with renovating Twitter headquarters. According to a lawsuit by former Twitter employees, when Joseph Killian, who oversaw office design, said permits would be needed for a restroom for Musk, Davis responded: "We don't do that; we don't have to follow those rules", and suggested hiring an unlicensed plumber instead.

Davis left Twitter soon after complaints about his cost-cutting reached the CEO, Linda Yaccarino.

=== Department of Government Efficiency (DOGE) ===
In 2024, Davis oversaw America PAC, a Donald Trump-supporting super PAC that Musk had financially backed. According to a New York Times investigation, Davis was involved in the scheme to pay people to sign a petition.

Davis took part in the Musk "landing team" that interviewed candidates for the Department of Government Efficiency. The New York Times reported that Davis is "effectively the leader of DOGE", making major decisions without going through acting administrator Amy Gleason. The Times reported that Davis led the effort to email all government employees at once, resulting in the "Fork in the Road" email, which contained a government-wide resignation offer.

Davis was reported to be an administrator of day-to-day operations at DOGE, and former DOGE staffer Sahil Lavingia described him as a chief of staff. Davis and his wife had a base in the General Services Administration (GSA) building guarded by a full security detail. In February, Davis pressed Social Security Administration (SSA) officials to give DOGE engineer Akash Bobba access to databases containing sensitive information. Davis led a DOGE effort to migrate the SSA's over 60 million lines of source code developed in COBOL; Davis set the unlikely timeframe of only a few months, "risking benefits and system collapse," according to experts; the bug testing phase alone for such a large project normally taking many years. Davis left DOGE at the end of May 2025.

Davis continued to assert control over the program after his official departure in May 2025, defying White House orders and prompting internal confusion and legal concerns. Politico reported that Davis held unauthorized meetings, installed allies as leaders, and removed dissenters, leading to resignations and dismissals across the initiative.

== Reputation ==
According to Adam Green, a longtime friend, Davis's "former Washington, D.C. apartment looked like a start-up, with a ping pong table and beverage machine to delight guests." However, Green said that Davis later changed from a "fun outside-the-box thinker" to a "blind servant" of Elon Musk. Jared Birchall remarked, "If Elon asked Steve to jump out of a window, he would do it." Musk himself told a group at Mar-a-Lago that nobody in the world was better than Davis at dismantling organizations, while acknowledging that he might not be the right person to build them. "Steve is like chemo," Musk said. "A little chemo can save your life; a lot of chemo could kill you." While numerous photos of Davis exist related to his "fun" enterprises in DC like the yogurt shop, after he became more deeply involved with Musk, he has attempted to stay out of public view, having mostly avoided having his picture taken.

== Personal life ==
Davis is married to Nicole Hollander, who worked with him at Twitter and later at the General Services Administration. They have a child.

Davis is an advisor to the Atlas Society that promotes the philosophy of Ayn Rand. In July 2012, he made a 45-minute presentation at the Atlas Summit on SpaceX and the future of space flight.

== Publications ==
In 2010, Davis submitted a thesis called The Trend Towards the Debasement of American Currency. In it he argues that the debasement of the currency since 1792 "occurred subtly due to ten discrete events". The dissertation includes a regression analysis.

In 2012, Davis collaborated on the technical report entitled Red Dragon: Low-cost Access to the Surface of Mars using Commercial Capabilities.

== See also ==
- United States federal government targets of Elon Musk
