= Tom Krause (business executive) =

CEO of Cloud Software Group

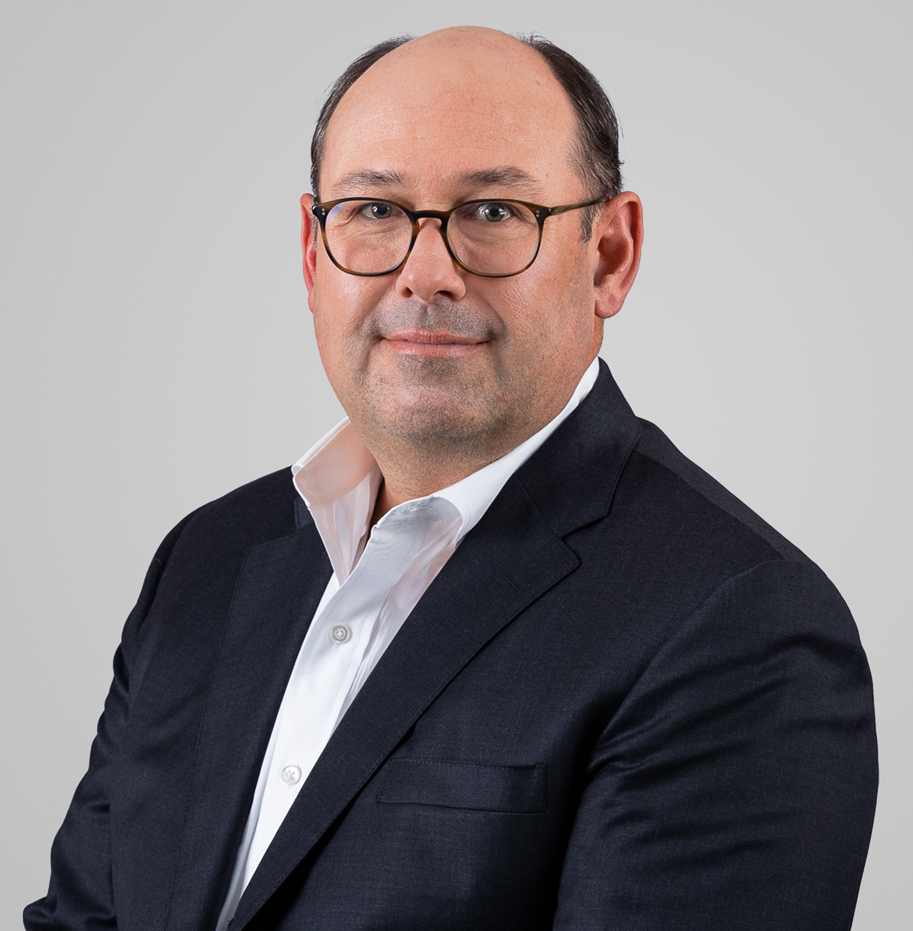
- Born: 1977 or 1978 (age 48–49)
- Education: Princeton University (BA)
- Occupation: Business executive
- Title: CEO, Cloud Software Group former Fiscal Assistant Secretary of the Treasury

Tom Krause (born 1977 or 1978) is an American business executive who was the Fiscal Assistant Secretary of the Treasury from February to June, 2025 and chief executive officer of the Cloud Software Group. Krause's dual positions raised ethics concerns, as his company has contracts with the federal government worth millions.

Krause's departure from the U.S. Treasury in 2025 also concluded his involvement with the Department of Government Efficiency.

== Education ==
Krause earned a B.A. in economics from Princeton University.

== Career ==
Krause began his career as an investment banking analyst at Robertson Stephens. He later worked at venture capital firm Technology Crossover Ventures for two years before serving as vice president of business development at Techwell for six years. He then founded Krause Consulting Group, where he advised public and private technology companies on financial strategy.

In 2016, Krause joined Avago Technologies as vice president of corporate development. Following Avago's merger with Broadcom, he became Broadcom Inc.'s chief financial officer, overseeing financial functions, mergers and acquisitions, human resources, and investor relations. This included the acquisition of Symantec's enterprise security business in 2019. In 2020, he was appointed president of Broadcom's software group, overseeing six software divisions. He participated in negotiations for Broadcom's $61 billion acquisition of VMware and was involved in assessing VMware's research and development expenditures.

In July 2022, Krause resigned from Broadcom and became chief executive officer of the Cloud Software Group, which owns Citrix Systems, Tibco, Spotfire, and Jaspersoft. The company provides cloud and information technology services to a global customer base. After Krause joined Cloud Software group it laid off 15 percent of its employees. A year later it laid off an additional 12 percent.

In January 2025, Krause became involved with the U.S. Treasury Department as part of the Department of Government Efficiency (DOGE). He was assigned as a special government employee to review the federal payment system and was granted limited access as a liaison between the Treasury and DOGE. According to Secretary Scott Bessent, Krause's DOGE involvement was for auditing purposes and included "read-only" access to the coded data of the payment system. On February 7, 2025, he was appointed as the Fiscal Assistant Secretary of the Treasury, the highest-ranking non-political position in this office, succeeding Matthew Garber who had been acting in the role since David Lebryk's resignation. Krause continued to work at Cloud Software Group despite his employment by DOGE, this had been cited as a potential conflict of interest. Krause's position at the Treasury included oversight of "U.S. debt, management of large-scale tech systems and handling of the federal debt limit."

In late March 2025, Krause reported extensive financial holdings in companies doing business with the Treasury Department and other executive agencies including those providing services to Treasury's fiscal services bureau, those participating in Treasury bond auctions the bureau manages, government contractors and large technology firms. Krause and two other members of the Treasury DOGE team also reported owning shares in Intuit, parent company of TurboTax, which has lobbied against Treasury's IRS Direct File program, a program DOGE had targeted for elimination. These holdings raised ethics concerns among former Treasury officials and government oversight experts, though a Treasury spokesperson stated all involved were following government ethics rules.

Krause's departure from the Department of Treasury was effective on June 6, 2025.

== See also ==
- Network of the Department of Government Efficiency
- Marko Elez
