= Marko Elez =

Software engineer

- Born: 1999/2000 (age 26–27)
- Education: Rutgers University
- Occupations: Software engineer, Department of Government Efficiency

Marko Elez (born 1999 or 2000) is an American software engineer and a government employee as part of Elon Musk's Department of Government Efficiency (DOGE). He came under public scrutiny after being granted administrator-level access to critical US Treasury payment systems, despite having no previous experience in government.

== Early life and education ==
Raised in Montgomery Township, New Jersey, Elez graduated from Montgomery High School in 2018. While in high school, Elez was a member of the soccer team for three seasons. He graduated from Rutgers University in 2021, a year early, where he studied computer science. Elez interned at Amazon the summer of his freshman year where he worked on algorithms to optimize delivery routing protocols.

== Career ==
=== SpaceX ===
According to his resume, which was made public under the Freedom of Information Act (FOIA), Elez began working full-time at SpaceX during his second year of college and completed his degree concurrently. He joined as a Software Engineer I on the vehicle software team in October 2020, where he served as the responsible engineer for SpaceX's distributed telemetry datastore. Elez provided regular support during crewed and uncrewed Falcon 9 and Starship missions, as well as Starlink satellite launches.

In August 2021, during his second year at SpaceX, Elez was promoted to Software Engineer II and joined the Starship software team where he worked on manufacturing systems for Starship subassemblies and infrastructure for vehicle software systems.

In September 2022, during his final year at SpaceX, Elez joined the Starlink satellite software team as a Software Engineer II, where he worked on the over-the-air software update system for Starlink satellites, gateways, WiFi routers, and user terminals. He also worked on the automated collision avoidance system for Starlink satellites in low Earth orbit.

He later joined X (formerly Twitter), focusing on search AI and software development. He also began working at xAI, where he was listed as an active employee as of February 2025. Business Insider also tied Elez to Musk's brain computer interface startup Neuralink, though his exact affiliation is unclear. His work experience prior to DOGE was exclusively within Elon Musk's companies.

=== Department of Government Efficiency ===
Elez joined Elon Musk's Department of Government Efficiency (DOGE) and was subsequently appointed to the Treasury Department. Shortly after joining, he was granted administrator-level access to the Payment Automation Manager and Secure Payment System at the Bureau of the Fiscal Service (BFS). According to Treasury records, these payment systems disbursed over $5.45 trillion in fiscal year 2024. His privileges allowed him to modify critical financial infrastructure, and choke off money to specific federal agencies or individuals, despite concerns from Treasury officials and lawmakers.

In early February 2025, Elez visited a Treasury facility in Kansas City, meeting with BFS staff and gaining deeper insight into the federal payment processing system. Acting Treasury Secretary David Lebryk reportedly resisted DOGE operatives' attempts to gain access to Treasury payment systems, but was placed on administrative leave — prompting his subsequent resignation. Elez's access to treasury systems was restricted on February 5. Treasury officials told Wired that it would be extremely uncommon for a Bureau of Fiscal Services employee to have access to the payment system mainframes and the databases simultaneously. According to a Treasury official's affidavit, Elez used his access to intercept and review foreign aid payment files, including ones coming from USAID, prior to disbursement. Elez reportedly copied and downloaded a pair of USAID files from the PAM database to his laptop.

Concerns remain that DOGE's influence could allow for politically motivated financial decisions. Treasury officials revoked Elez's system access on February 5. In court filings on February 11, the Treasury Department acknowledged that Elez, along with Tom Krause, had been granted read/write permissions to the payment system, they claimed inadvertently, revising their previous assertion that he had only read-only access. The government maintained that Elez had not used his ability to edit treasury systems.

Elez resigned from DOGE on February 6, 2025, after being linked to a now-deleted social media account containing racist content; the account had also posted in support of eugenics. The tweets made by the account, under the handle @nullllptr, included statements such as "I would not mind at all if Gaza and Israel were both wiped off the face of the Earth" in June 2024 and "Just for the record, I was racist before it was cool" in July 2024. In September 2024, shortly before the account's deletion, it posted, "You could not pay me to marry outside of my ethnicity" and "Normalize Indian hate."

The following day, Elon Musk initiated a poll on X asking users whether Elez should be rehired. The majority of the 385,000 X users polled said that Elez should be rehired. Musk stated that "to err is human, to forgive divine."

Vice President JD Vance subsequently advocated for Elez's reinstatement. Vance wrote in a post on X that while he did not agree "with some of Elez's posts… I don't think stupid social media activity should ruin a kid's life." President Donald Trump endorsed Vance's position at a news conference, after which Musk announced Elez's reinstatement. Some Indian American groups protested the decision to rehire Elez. U.S. representative Ro Khanna challenged JD Vance directly over the decision. In April 2025, Second Lady of the United States Usha Vance, who is of Indian heritage, said in a The Free Press interview that she condemned the views as "terrible" and said that "Very, very intelligent people say things that are sometimes very, very ill-founded" because of the modern, quick-moving information ecosystem.

Elez subsequently appeared on a roster of DOGE employees, with a government email address linked to the Executive Office of the President. Later that week, he was reportedly reinstated at the Social Security Administration.

In March 2025, Business Insider reported that Elez was part of a DOGE detachment assigned to the Department of Labor. A March 2025 lawsuit alleged that Elez had violated Treasury policy by emailing an unencrypted spreadsheet containing personal information to members of the Trump administration. According to TechCrunch, "The filing did not say exactly what data was shared, but described the personal information as including a name (such as a person or entity), the type of transaction, and an amount of money." Later in March 2025, The Office of the Chief Information Officer in the HHS was asked to submit information about three DOGE members, including Elez. "The request asked for access agreements for grants and contract databases, Medicare/Medicaid databases, HIGLAS and other databases containing personal information. It also requested documents or records showing approval to share information or documents 'from HHS systems outside of HHS.'"

As of April 2025, The New York Times reports that Elez holds positions at Customs and Border Protection, Immigration and Customs Enforcement (ICE), and the Department of Homeland Security. While employed by both the Social Security Administration (SSA) and ICE, Elez was involved in a data-sharing agreement that permitted ICE to use SSA data for law enforcement purposes. Elez serves on a DOGE immigration task force, led by billionaire Antonio Gracias, that developed the technical framework for a comprehensive set of measures, including parole revocations, visa terminations, and subsequent reforms to the asylum adjudication process. The task force's initial actions involved terminating parole for 6,300 undocumented immigrants with criminal records or listed on the FBI's terrorist watchlist. This effort required coordination with the Social Security Administration, where Elez is employed, to deactivate their Social Security numbers by adding them to a database used for tracking deceased individuals.

Later in April 2025, The New York Times reported that Elez, alongside another DOGE engineer, was leading President Trump's "gold card" initiative, a program enabling the United States to offer special immigration visas for $5 million each. Days later, Wired reported that Elez had access to the Department of Labor's Reentry Employment Opportunities (REO) program, which funds job training and employment services for formerly incarcerated individuals. Concurrently, The Washington Post reported that Elez, serving as a DOGE advisor at the Department of Justice, had gained access to the Executive Office for Immigration Review's Courts and Appeals System (ECAS). This system contains detailed records of immigrants' interactions with the U.S. immigration system, including names, addresses, prior immigration court testimony, and any law enforcement history.

On May 19, 2025, the U.S. Department of Labor released records, including Elez's resume, in response to a Freedom of Information Act request by American Oversight for appointee resumes and ethics documents concerning DOGE Service teams at the agency.

On July 13, 2025, Elez published a GitHub repository that accidentally included an API key with access to at least 52 xAI large language models. The repository was taken down shortly, following the leak's identification by a security consultant.

== See also ==
- Network of the Department of Government Efficiency
- Tom Krause (business executive)
- Luke Farritor
