= Techwell Inc. =

- Company type: Division
- Industry: Electronics
- Founded: 1997; 29 years ago in San Jose, California
- Headquarters: Milpitas, California, United States
- Parent: Intersil

Techwell Inc. was a fabless semiconductor company founded in 1997, that was based in San Jose, California. It is now a division of Intersil.

== History ==
Techwell had an initial public offering (IPO) on the Nasdaq in 2006, trading under NASDAQ: TWLL.

Techwell was acquired by Intersil on March 22, 2010, for US$370 million.

Intersil Techwell develops chips for video devices such as security video systems, LCD based entertainment systems, in-flight entertainment systems, digital video recorders and automobile rear view video monitors. The Intersil Techwell division is based in Milpitas, California.
