= Edgelord =

Attention-seeking extremist

An edgelord is someone, typically on the Internet, who tries to impress or shock by posting exaggerated opinions such as misanthropy, nihilism or extremist views or extremely cynical and pessimistic ("edgy") opinions.

According to the Merriam-Webster.com online dictionary, the first known usage of the word "edgelord" under this definition was in 2013. It was added to Webster's in September 2023. Webster gave the following example:

We decided to watch It's a Wonderful Life and my dad said, "Every year I wait for Jimmy Stewart to jump off that bridge, but he never does it" — merry Xmas from the original edgelord.

Edgelords were characterised by author and journalist Rachel Monroe in her account of criminal behavior, Savage Appetites:

... Internet cynics lumped the online Nazis together with the serial killer fetishists and the dumbest goths and dismissed them all as edgelords — kids who tried to be scary online. I thought of most of these edgelords as basement-dwellers, pale faces lit by the glow of their computer screen, puffing themselves up with nihilism. An edgelord was a scrawny guy with a LARP-y vibe, possibly wearing a cloak, dreaming of omnipotence. Or a girl with excessive eyeliner and lots of Tumblr posts about self-harm. The disturbing content posted by edgelords was undermined by its predictability ...

It is frequently associated with the forum site 4chan. The renegade rhetoric of the edgelord is often intentionally used by the far right to troll leftist targets.

== See also ==
- Épater la bourgeoisie
- Schadenfreude
- Sealioning
- Shock jock
- Shock site
- The cruelty is the point
