= Edward Coristine =

American programmer known as "Big Balls" (born 2005)

- Born: Edward Henry Coristine; December 2005 (age 20)
- Other name: Big Balls
- Education: Rye Country Day School; Northeastern University
- Occupation: Programmer
- Employers: Neuralink; Department of Government Efficiency
- Political party: Republican
- Relatives: Valery Martynov (grandfather)

Edward "Big Balls" Coristine (born December 2005) is an American programmer who was appointed to the Department of Government Efficiency (DOGE) during the second presidency of Donald Trump. Coristine is known for his association with Elon Musk and DOGE, his youth and inexperience relative to his responsibilities with DOGE, and his nickname.

== Early life and education ==
Edward Henry Coristine was born in December 2005. His father is Charles Coristine, the CEO of the LesserEvil organic snack company. His maternal grandfather, Valery Martynov, was a KGB lieutenant colonel executed in 1987 by the Soviet Union as a double agent. After Martynov's execution, his widow moved with her children—including Coristine's mother Anna—to the United States.

Coristine graduated from Rye Country Day School in 2024. He acquired the nickname "Big Balls" in his junior year of high school when a teacher read aloud a captioned phallic drawing of his in class and he embraced the moniker, later adding it to his LinkedIn profile. He enrolled at Northeastern University in 2024 as a mechanical engineering and physics major. School friends describe him as intelligent and driven, with Elon Musk being his hero. Coristine is a registered Republican.

== Career ==
=== Early career ===
A computer programmer and former engineering student, Coristine has founded a number of startups with companies registered in Connecticut, Delaware, and the United Kingdom. One of the startups offers an artificial intelligence Discord bot for the Russian market. Coristine owns a limited liability company named TESLA.SEXY that was launched in 2021 and manages web domains for image hosting services, some of which are registered in Russia.

Coristine briefly worked for cybersecurity firm Path Network. Bloomberg News reported that Coristine was fired from his internship at Path Network in 2022 for allegedly leaking internal company information to a competitor. Following his dismissal, a large collection of internal Path documents and conversations was leaked online. Coristine wrote that although he had retained access to Path Network's servers, he did not exploit it. Path Network confirmed that Coristine had been fired following a security incident.

Coristine's online content delivery network, DiamondCDN, has reportedly facilitated the work of the cybercriminal group EGodly. In 2023, EGodly thanked DiamondCDN, saying, "We extend our gratitude to our valued partners DiamondCDN for generously providing us with their amazing DDoS protection and caching systems, which allow us to securely host and safeguard our website." EGodly has claimed involvement in a number of crimes including email hacking, theft of cryptocurrency, and the harassment of a former FBI agent.

According to investigative journalist Brian Krebs, Coristine has been active in a group of online communities known as "The Com", a network of Discord and Telegram channels associated with cybercrime activities.

Coristine worked for a short time at Neuralink, an Elon Musk-run enterprise.

=== Federal government ===
Coristine worked at the Department of Government Efficiency (DOGE) after President Donald Trump took office in January 2025. He was among a group of nineteen- to twenty-five-year-olds without prior experience in government who were appointed to DOGE; Coristine was the youngest member of the group. He worked within the Office of Personnel Management (OPM) and reported directly to Amanda Scales, a former xAI employee appointed as OPM chief of staff. OPM records listed his role as "expert". According to Wired, Coristine sat in on calls using a non-government email address where workers were directed to "go over code they had written and justify their jobs". On one call with federal Small Business Administration staff, Coristine asserted that DOGE wanted access to human resources, contract, and payment systems at the agency.

Coristine was discussed in a February 2, 2025 WIRED article entitled "The Young, Inexperienced Engineers Aiding Elon Musk's Government Takeover". Intelligencer published a February 2025 article on Coristine entitled " 'Big Balls' on Top of the World". Saturday Night Live mentioned Coristine in a March 1, 2025, skit. A March 26, 2025 USA Today article reported that Coristine's nickname had become a "pop culture punchline". In a spring 2025 interview with Musk and with DOGE employees, Fox News host Jesse Watters asked, "'Who is Big Balls?'" "'I am'", Coristine replied. He added that he was working on rooting out fraud and abuse in regard to government spending. The interview made Coristine "well known online and among Musk's immense fanbase".

Also in 2025, Coristine served as a senior advisor at the Bureau of Diplomatic Technology of the United States Department of State, the Department of Homeland Security, and the Federal Emergency Management Agency. In addition, he held positions at the United States Agency for International Development and the Cybersecurity and Infrastructure Security Agency. On May 31, 2025, Coristine became a full-time General Services Administration employee at a General Schedule grade of 15 (the top civil service grade in the federal government). In June 2025, Coristine resigned from the General Services Administration. He was then hired by the Social Security Administration.

In August 2025, The Independent stated that Coristine's nickname was better known than his actual name.

A whistleblower disclosure on August 26, 2025, by Social Security Administration chief data officer Charles Borges alleged that Coristine and others had uploaded the Social Security numbers and other personal information of 300 million Americans to a "vulnerable" cloud server. Borges said this action created a risk of widespread identity theft in the event of a leak or hack and that it "potentially violated multiple federal statutes" regarding the protection of government data. In 2026, Coristine began working as an engineering lead at the National Design Studio (NDS) under the Executive Office of the President, helping build the Trump administration's digital front door website, America.gov.

== Personal life ==
Coristine was assaulted in an attempted carjacking in Washington, D.C. in the early morning hours of August 3, 2025, an incident which was cited by President Trump in a criticism of high crime rates in the city and which he used as a rationale to federalize the city's police force and deploy the National Guard. Two teenage suspects were arrested following the attack, while police indicated that "multiple suspects remain outstanding". Coristine suffered a broken nose and a concussion in the attack; he was later interviewed about it by Jesse Watters of Fox News. The male suspect pleaded guilty to attempted robbery and assault in connection with the attack on Coristine, and the female suspect pleaded guilty to assault. Both defendants were sentenced to probation.

== See also ==
- Department of Government Efficiency
- Elon Musk
- Marko Elez
- Luke Farritor
