= Nate Cavanaugh =

American tech entrepreneur (born 1996)

President of the United States Institute of Peace
- In office March 28, 2025 – May 19, 2025
- Preceded by: George Moose

Personal details
- Born: 28 May 1996 (age 30)
- Education: Indiana University Bloomington (dropped out)

Nate (Nathan) Cavanaugh is a former member of the Department of Government Efficiency (DOGE), a concluded initiative of the second administration of Donald Trump. In 2025, Cavanaugh led the US Institute for Peace and co-led the National Endowment for the Humanities with Justin Fox.

In his role as a DOGE staffer, he was responsible for terminating nearly all of the grants at the National Endowment for the Humanities and is the subject of a lawsuit filed in 2026.

Cavanaugh was also appointed acting director of the Interagency Council on Homelessness, and placed the agency's entire staff on administrative leave.

== Career ==
=== Education ===
Cavanaugh was a 19-year-old student at Indiana University when he dropped out of college. Cavanaugh is the son of Pat Cavanaugh, founder of Ready Nutrition.

=== Second Trump administration ===
On March 12, 2025, Cavanaugh and fellow DOGE employee Justin Fox began overseeing the Department of Government Efficiency’s work with the National Endowment for the Humanities (NEH) after its chair, Shelly C. Lowe, left at President Donald Trump's direction and NEH general counsel Michael Patrick McDonald (born 1956) became acting chair.

Under Cavanaugh and Fox's leadership of the NEH, DOGE used ChatGPT to identify grants that were in violation of Trump's executive orders related to DEI, ultimately terminating 97% of the agency's grants within 22 days. Fox and Cavanaugh prompted the chat bot to answer in less than 120 characters.

In March 2025, after Cavanaugh was appointed president of the US Institute for Peace, he transferred ownership of the headquarters building to the General Services Administration. On May 18, Cavanaugh's appointment was ruled unlawful by Judge Beryl Howell.

Cavanaugh was deposed on January 23, 2026, as part of a lawsuit brought by the American Council of Learned Societies, the American Historical Association, and the Modern Language Association against the Trump administration in connection with his role in the termination of NEH grants. Videos of Cavanaugh and Fox's depositions went viral.

In subsequent court filings, the plaintiffs and NEH produced additional materials describing DOGE's involvement in grant terminations.

Discovery materials in the lawsuit state that Cavanaugh, as part of a small DOGE team including Fox, advised NEH leadership on identifying previously awarded grants for possible termination under Trump administration executive orders and that DOGE staff used spreadsheet keyword searches and the ChatGPT language model to help flag projects for review. Cavanaugh admitted that the DOGE team was not successful in reducing the deficit, but that he did not regret harming the livelihood of those whose grants he was involved in terminating.

On March 13, 2026, judge Colleen McMahon of the Federal District Court in Manhattan ordered the viral videos of Fox and Cavanaugh's depositions to be taken down, ordering the scholarly groups "take any and all possible steps to claw back” the videos. Ten days later, Judge McMahon lifted her order, ruling that the risk of "embarrassment and reputational harm" was not enough to overcome the public interest in Cavanaugh's and Fox's descriptions of their official conduct.

In May 2026, Judge McMahon ruled that DOGE's cancellation of the humanities grants was unconstitutional, calling it "a textbook example of unconstitutional viewpoint discrimination".

=== Private sector ===
In April 2026, Wired published an investigation titled "Where the DOGE Operatives Are Now". According to the investigation, both Cavanaugh and his former subordinate Justin Fox are currently employed at Special, an AI startup to bring "DOGE for the private sector."

On June 3, 2026, Cavanaugh announced the launch of Special on X, with backing from Marc Andreessen’s venture capital firm a16z. In a post on a16z’s Substack, Cavanaugh and Fox wrote that Special will build "an operating system to transform critical American industries with AI."
