= Antonio Gracias =

American investor (born 1970)

- Born: c. 1970 (age 55–56); Detroit, Michigan, US
- Education: Georgetown University (BSFS, MSFS); University of Chicago (JD)
- Occupation: Private equity investor
- Years active: 1995 to present
- Known for: Founding of Valor Equity Partners which has invested in Elon Musk's companies
- Board member of: Tesla, Inc. (2007-2021); SpaceX
- Spouse: Sabrina Kuhl Gracias
- Children: 3
- Website: www.valorep.com/team/antonio-gracias

Antonio Gracias is an American businessman who founded Valor Equity Partners. He has been on the board of directors for several companies in which Valor has invested, including Tesla, Inc. and SpaceX.

A longtime ally of Elon Musk, Gracias has received media attention for his participation in the Department of Government Efficiency. Forbes estimated his net worth at US$2.2 billion as of April 2025, while his stake in SpaceX was worth more than US$65 billion as of June 2026.

== Early life and education ==
Gracias was born in Detroit, Michigan to immigrant parents. His father was a neurosurgeon from India and his mother a pharmacist from Spain running a shop.

Gracias attended Georgetown University where he pursued a joint degree program in the Walsh School of Foreign Service, graduating with a BSFS and MSFS with a concentration in international economics in 1993.

He also studied abroad at Waseda University in Tokyo, Japan, later returning to that city for a fellowship with Nikko Securities. He later attended the University of Chicago Law School, graduating with a JD in 1998.

As of 2025, Gracias is a member of the board of advisors for the Walsh School of Foreign Service at Georgetown University, as well as the University of Chicago board of trustees.

== Career ==
While in law school, in 1995, Gracias founded MG Capital, a private equity firm whose core team formed the basis for the founding of Valor Equity Partners. He is Valor's chief executive officer and chief investment officer. Valor often invests in companies led or funded by Elon Musk. In addition to Tesla and SpaceX, Valor's portfolio companies include Anduril Industries, Neuralink, Reddit, Eight Sleep, and Zipline.

Gracias was a member of Tesla’s board of directors from 2007 to 2021.

Gracias is a trustee of The Aspen Institute. He is also a member of the board of the Pritzker School of Molecular Engineering at the University of Chicago and a member of the University of Chicago board of trustees. Gracias was named as one of the Presidential Ambassadors for Global Entrepreneurship by President Obama in May 2015.

== Department of Government Efficiency ==
Following earlier part-time involvement with the Department of Government Efficiency (DOGE), in March 2025, Gracias took on a role at the Social Security Administration to focus on DOGE cost-cutting efforts in the Social Security program. Gracias left DOGE in July 2025.

He was an early investor in Tesla through Valor Equity Partners and served on Tesla's board from 2007 to 2021. He has also worked as Tesla's lead independent director. He continues to serve on the SpaceX board and is an investor in Neuralink.

== Political donations ==
In 2007 and 2012, Gracias donated to presidential primary candidate, Barack Obama. In 2007 and 2016, he supported Hillary Clinton in the presidential election. In 2020, Gracias contributed nearly $500,000 to Joe Biden’s campaign and the Democratic National Committee.

In 2024, America PAC During the first half of 2025, Gracias donated $1 million to MAGA Inc., a super PAC that supports Donald Trump.

== Philanthropy ==
He is part of a broader movement among Silicon Valley investors interested in the therapeutic and commercial potential of psychedelic drugs. He donated $1 million to the Multidisciplinary Association for Psychedelic Studies (MAPS) in 2020, and in 2023 contributed $16 million to psychedelics research at Harvard University. Gracias funded research at Imperial College London Centre for Psychedelic Research and the Icahn School of Medicine.

In 2022, Gracias donated $5 million to Georgetown University through the Gracias Family Foundation to establish the Gracias Family Sunflower Current Use Scholarship, which provides financial support and emergency assistance to students displaced by the war in Ukraine.
