= Luke Farritor =

American software engineer

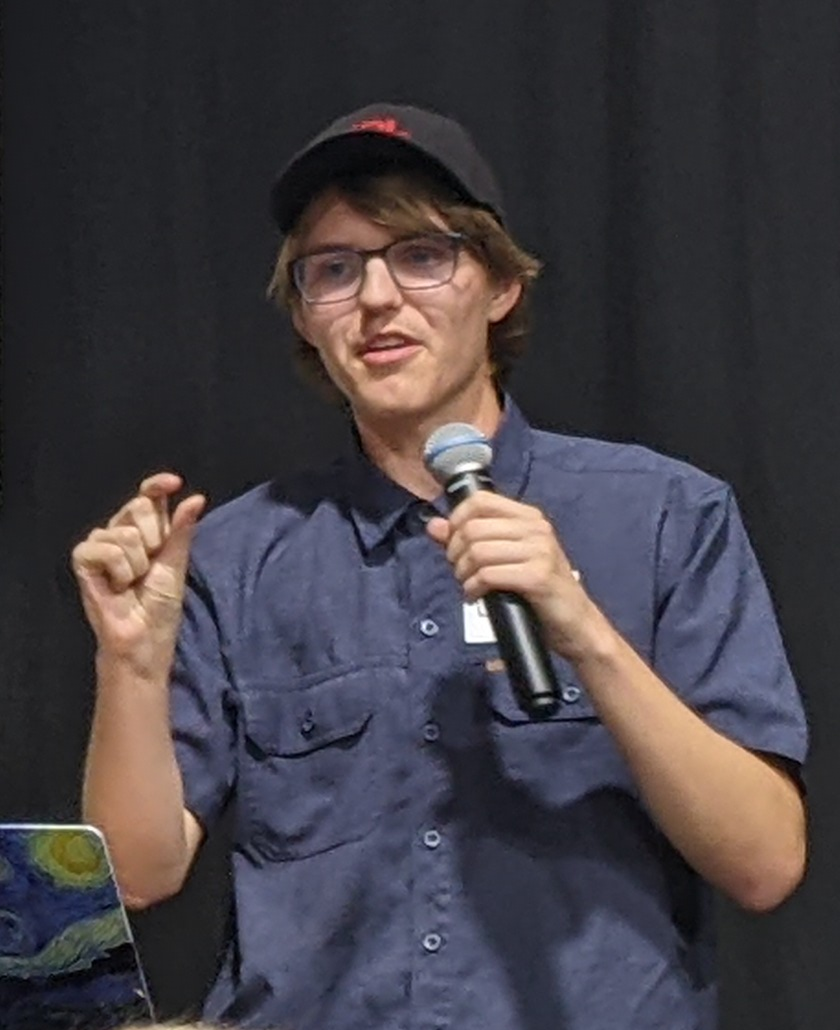
- Farritor in 2023
- Education: University of Nebraska–Lincoln (dropped out)
- Occupation: Software engineer
- Employer: Department of Government Efficiency
- Father: Shane Farritor

Luke Farritor (born 2001/2002) is an American software engineer known for having worked at the Department of Government Efficiency (DOGE).

== Early life and education ==
Farritor is the son of Shane Farritor, a University of Nebraska–Lincoln professor from Ravenna, Nebraska. At 19, he produced Soundtracks for the Present Future at the Contemporary Arts Center of Nebraska, an installation featuring 59 guitars and mandolins controlled via computer.

Farritor interned at SpaceX in 2023. That year, he won a $40,000 prize from the Vesuvius Challenge for using artificial intelligence to uncover ten letters from one of the Herculaneum Papyri scrolls. In February 2024, Farritor and his team won the $700,000 grand prize for revealing more than 2,000 additional characters.

Farritor studied computer science at the University of Nebraska–Lincoln before dropping out to become a Thiel Fellow in 2024.

== Career ==
In 2025, Farritor joined Elon Musk's Department of Government Efficiency. At that time, he was one of a group of six young men between the ages of 19 and 24 at the agency. As of February 2025, Farritor held a General Services Administration (GSA) email and A-suite level clearance, with access to all GSA physical spaces and IT systems, according to Wired. He also became an executive engineer in the office of the secretary of Health and Human Services. On February 6, 2025, Energy Secretary Chris Wright granted Farritor access to the department's computer systems.

Farritor manually vetoed payments to the HIV/AIDS relief program PEPFAR even after some payments had been approved by White House officials and Secretary of State Marco Rubio.

Effective May 31, 2025, Farritor became a full-time government employee at a General Schedule grade of GS-15 (the top grade). It is unclear if Farritor remains in that position as of 2026.

== See also ==
- Marko Elez
- Edward Coristine
