= Economy Act (disambiguation) =

A number of pieces of legislation are known as the Economy Act.

In the United States:

- the Economy Act of 1932, which established the purchasing authority of the federal government
- the Economy Act of March 20, 1933, part of Roosevelt's "New Deal". (38 U.S.C. § 701)

In the United Kingdom, a common name for either of:

- the Economy (Miscellaneous Provisions) Act 1926 (16 & 17 Geo. 5. c. 9), see Representation of the People Act
- the National Economy Act 1931 (21 & 22 Geo. 5. c. 48), see List of acts of the Parliament of the United Kingdom from 1931
