= Bisignano (surname) =

Bisignano is an Italian surname. Notable people with the surname include:

- Frank Bisignano (born 1959), American businessman
- Tony Bisignano (born 1952), American politician

== See also ==
- Bisignano
