= Leland Dudek =

American government official

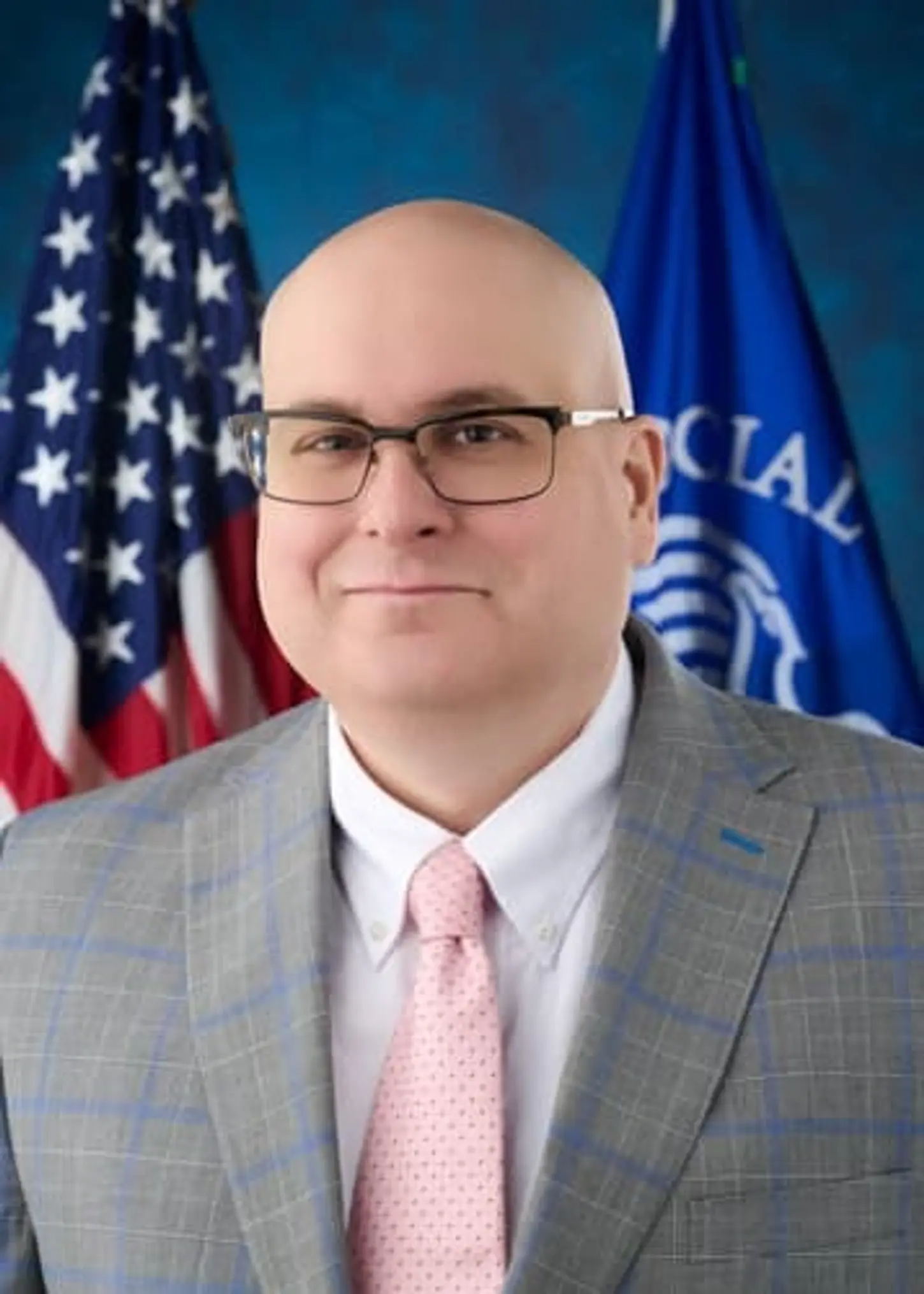
- Official portrait, 2025

Commissioner of the Social Security Administration
- Acting
- In office February 16, 2025 – May 7, 2025
- President: Donald Trump
- Preceded by: Michelle King (acting)
- Succeeded by: Frank Bisignano

Personal details
- Born: 1976 or 1977 (age 49–50)
- Party: Democratic
- Education: Catholic University of America (BA); National Defense University (MS)

Leland "Lee" Dudek (born 1976 or 1977) is an American public servant who served as the acting commissioner of the Social Security Administration (SSA). Prior to this, he worked for the Recovery Accountability and Transparency Board and in the SSA's anti-fraud office.

Educated at the Catholic University of America and National Defense University, Dudek worked as an analyst in information technology, cybersecurity, and fraud prevention for the United States federal government.

Dudek provided the Department of Government Efficiency information without authorization and was placed under investigation for it, but President Donald Trump appointed him commissioner. Dudek reduced research funding and demoted executives opposed to him and threatened to cease the SSA's operations. He feuded with Governor of Maine Janet Mills for comments made to Trump.

== Early life and education ==
Leland Dudek was raised in Saginaw, Michigan. His parents divorced when he was young and his mother lived off of Social Security benefits due to a disability. Dudek graduated from the Catholic University of America with a Bachelor of Arts degree and the College of Information and Cyberspace at the National Defense University with a Master of Science in Government Information Leadership.

== Early career ==
Dudek was given a Certified Information Systems Security Professional certification in 2006. He was the Chief Information Security Officer for the Recovery Accountability and Transparency Board. For 25 years he was an analyst who worked in information technology, cybersecurity and fraud prevention in the United States federal government. He served as a redistricting commissioner for Hyattsville, Maryland, and was a member of the Selective Service System local board.

In 2009, Dudek became an IT security official at the Social Security Administration (SSA). He was critical of the way the agency was managed and frequently cited James Q. Wilson's Bureaucracy, a book critical of the SSA. He was working in the anti-fraud office before being elected to commissioner of the SSA.

== Commissioner of the Social Security Administration ==
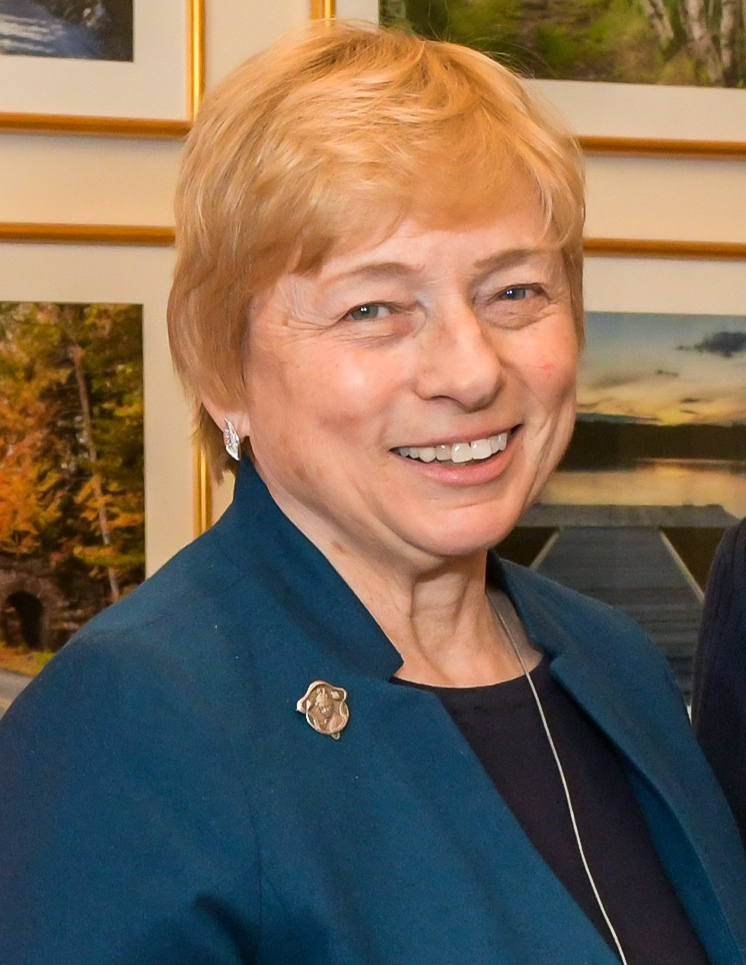
Dudek referred to Governor Janet Mills as a "petulant child". He cancelled SSA contracts with Maine amidst disputes the state had with President Donald Trump.

Dudek established contact with Steve Davis in December and started discussing how Department of Government Efficiency (DOGE) could work with the bureaucracy of the SSA. Dudek was put on leave by SSA leadership for sharing information with DOGE without authorization, but shortly thereafter President Donald Trump replaced acting commissioner Michelle King with Dudek on February 16, 2025. On Dudek's social media he praised DOGE.

During Dudek's tenure as acting commissioner he reduced funding for research programs and demoted senior executives who were responsible for him being placed on paid leave. He proposed digitizing Social Security cards. The Office of Transformation, which was tasked with creating an online application to replace paper-based forms, was closed at the request of DOGE official Scott Coulter. On March 6, SSA employees were barred from accessing certain sites, including news sites, which hampered their ability to view obituaries, which are used to prevent fraud. He threatened to cease the operations of the SSA after DOGE staffers were blocked from accessing SSA data by a court ruling, but retracted this threat.

In February 2025, Maine Governor Janet Mills told President Donald Trump that she would follow the law after he demanded Maine ban transgender athletes from women's sports, resulting in Trump threatening to remove funding to Maine, while Mills threatened a lawsuit. Later that month, Dudek told SSA staff to "cancel the contracts" regarding Maine, declaring: "While our improper payments will go up, and fraudsters may compromise identities, no money will go from the public trust to a petulant child", in reference to Mills.

In March 2025, Maine authorities reported that the SSA cancelled Maine's contracts for the Enumeration at Birth and Electronic Death Records programs. The Enumeration at Birth program, which was rolled out nationally in 1989, allowed parents to request their newborn children's Social Security numbers at hospitals, and 99% of children received their numbers this way, reported the SSA. The contract cancellation necessitated Maine parents to travel to a Social Security office to obtain their newborn's Social Security number. When the contract cancellations were made public, no reason was given for the cancellations. Within a week, the Maine contracts were restored, with Dudek saying: "ending these contracts created an undue burden on the people of Maine, which was not the intent. For that, I apologize". Later, Dudek told the media that he ordered the initial change in Maine because: "I was ticked at the governor of Maine for not being real cordial to the president … I screwed up." Dudek later told ProPublica that these actions were requested by DOGE and that he purposely used inflammatory language to cause a backlash in order to revert the orders.

In April 2025, The Washington Post reported that Dudek was persuaded by Homeland Security Secretary Kristi Noem to instruct the SSA to falsely list over 6,000 living immigrants in their database of dead people, despite Dudek's initial belief that this action was illegal.

U.S. Representative Gerry Connolly, the highest ranking Democratic member of the Committee on Oversight and Government Reform, sent a letter to Dudek on April 2, calling on him to resign. Dudek compared his role as commissioner to Oskar Schindler's efforts to save Jews during the Holocaust. Dudek was placed on administrative leave and was succeeded by Frank Bisignano. An op-ed written by Dudek in support of Trump was published by the New York Post on May 6, his last day as commissioner.

After Dudek's tenure as commissioner ended he criticized DOGE in an interview with ProPublica stating that they did not know what they were doing and wanted to run the government like a McDonald's. He stated that he was critical of a table created by DOGE claiming that 12 million people over the age of 120 were collecting benefits and tried to advise Elon Musk that these people were not collecting benefits. He was an anonymous source for The Washington Post and The New York Times while serving as commissioner.

== Personal life ==
Dudek is married. He is registered as a member of the Democratic Party and voted for Kamala Harris in the 2024 presidential election. Dudek stated that he has had difficulty finding a job after his tenure as commissioner as "My name is mud".

== Works cited ==
=== News ===
- Berzon, Alexandra; Nehamas, Nicholas; Bernard, Tara (June 16, 2025). "The Bureaucrat and the Billionaire: Inside DOGE's Chaotic Takeover of Social Security". The New York Times. Archived from the original on June 17, 2025.
- Delaney, Arthur (March 6, 2025). "Trump Administration Backtracks On Forcing Maine Parents To Visit Social Security Offices To Register Newborns". HuffPost. Archived from the original on March 26, 2025.
- Dudek, Leland (May 6, 2025). "Don't trust the media's Social Security hysteria: Trump is delivering results". New York Post. Archived from the original on August 28, 2025.
- Duehren, Andrew; Berzon, Alexandra; Bernard, Tara (March 24, 2025). "Social Security, Buffeted by Turmoil, Awaits a New Leader". The New York Times.
- Egwuonwu, Nnamdi; Atkins, Chloe; Grumbach, Gary (March 22, 2025). "Social Security chief backs down on threat to shut down agency after DOGE ruling". The Washington Post. Archived from the original on March 26, 2025.
- Hager, Eli (March 12, 2025). ""The President Wanted It and I Did It": Recording Reveals Head of Social Security's Thoughts on DOGE and Trump". ProPublica. Archived from the original on March 26, 2025.
- Hager, Eli (September 8, 2025). "The Untold Saga of What Happened When DOGE Stormed Social Security". ProPublica. Archived from the original on November 8, 2025.
- Kaplan, Juliana; Alexander, Reed; Campbell, Dakin (April 28, 2025). "The future of America's biggest safety net is in the hands of a career bureaucrat and a hard-charging finance titan". Business Insider. Archived from the original on April 29, 2025.
- Lawlor, Joe (April 2, 2025). "Social Security head called Gov. Mills a 'petulant child' in email ordering staff to cancel Maine contracts". Portland Press Herald. Archived from the original on April 3, 2025.
- Mistler, Steve Mistler (March 7, 2025). "Feds reinstate Mainers' ability to register newborns for Social Security numbers at hospital". Maine Public Radio.
- Natanson, Hannah; Rein, Lisa; Kornfield, Meryl (April 12, 2025). "Trump administration overrode Social Security staff to list immigrants as dead". The Washington Post.
- Rein, Lisa; Stein, Jeff; Natanson, Hannah (March 6, 2025). "DOGE is driving Social Security cuts and will make mistakes, acting head says privately". The Washington Post. Archived from the original on March 6, 2025.
- Rein, Lisa (February 22, 2025). "New Social Security chief was being investigated when Musk team tapped him". The Washington Post. Archived from the original on February 22, 2025.
- Rein, Lisa; McDaniel, Justine (March 18, 2025). "Social Security to require millions to make claims in person rather than by phone". The Washington Post. Archived from the original on March 23, 2025.
- Rein, Lisa; Bailey, Holly; Stein, Jeff; Bogage, Jacob (February 17, 2025). "Top Social Security official exits after clash with Musk's DOGE over data". The Washington Post. Archived from the original on February 22, 2025.
- Slater, Joanna; Rein, Lisa (April 2, 2025). "How the Trump administration took aim at Maine". The Washington Post. Archived from the original on April 2, 2025.

=== Web ===
- "Acting Commissioner Leland Dudek". Social Security Administration. Archived from the original on March 26, 2025.
- "Leland Dudek". Association of Government Accountants. Archived from the original on March 26, 2025.

Political offices
Preceded by Michelle King; Acting	Commissioner of the Social Security Administration; Acting; 2025	Succeeded by Frank Bisignano
