= Michelle King (government official) =

American government official

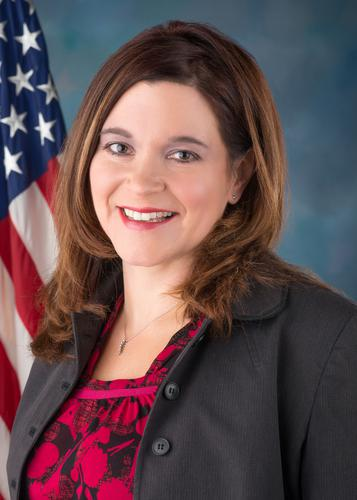
- Official portrait, 2025

Commissioner of the Social Security Administration
- Acting
- In office January 20, 2025 – February 16, 2025
- President: Donald Trump
- Preceded by: Carolyn Colvin (acting)
- Succeeded by: Leland Dudek (acting)

Personal details
- Education: Augustana College (BA); Northern Illinois University (MPA)

Michelle King is an American government official who was appointed as the acting United States Commissioner of Social Security Administration by Donald Trump on his inauguration day, January 20, 2025, and resigned on February 16, 2025.

== Education ==
King gained her Masters of Public Administration from Northern Illinois University in 1997 with a concentration in public policy and organizational development. She graduated cum laude with a dual Bachelor of Arts degree in political science and public administration from Augustana College in Rock Island, Illinois in 1993 and earned a minor in speech communications.

== Career ==
King worked at the Social Security Administration for 30 years. She resigned in February 2025 after refusing a request to grant the Department of Government Efficiency (DOGE) access to sensitive information.

Political offices
Preceded by Carolyn Colvin; Acting	Commissioner of the Social Security Administration; Acting; 2025	Succeeded by Leland Dudek; Acting
