= Frank Bisignano =

American businessman (born 1959)

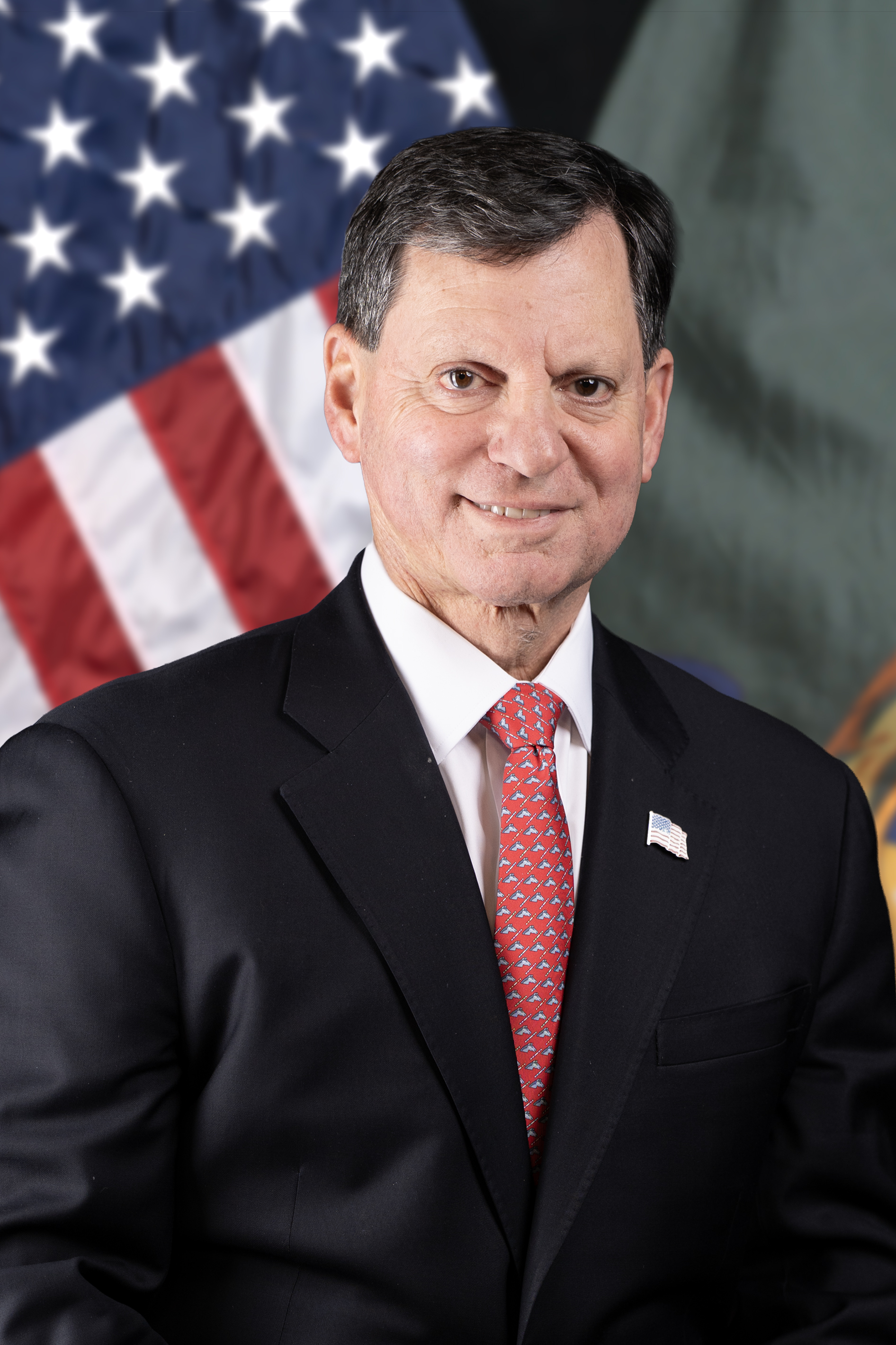
- Official portrait, 2026

18th Commissioner of the Social Security Administration
- Incumbent
- Assumed office May 7, 2025
- Deputy: Arjun Mody
- Preceded by: Leland Dudek (acting)

Chief Executive Officer of the Internal Revenue Service
- Incumbent
- Assumed office October 6, 2025
- President: Donald Trump
- Preceded by: Position established

Personal details
- Born: August 9, 1959 (age 67)
- Spouses: Nancy Hausner (m. 1986, divorced); Tracy O'Rourke (m. 2008)
- Children: 3
- Education: Baker University (BS)
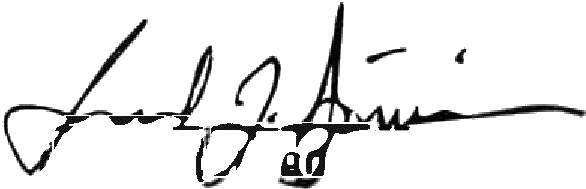
- Signature

Frank J. Bisignano (born August 9, 1959) is an American businessman who has served as the commissioner of the Social Security Administration since May 2025. Bisignano has additionally served as the chief executive officer of the Internal Revenue Service since October 2025.

Bisignano graduated from Baker University with a bachelor's degree in finance. By 1985, he had begun working at Shearson Lehman Brothers, serving as the company's senior vice president from 1986 to 1990. In August 2000, Bisignano became the chief administrative officer at Citigroup. In December 2005, he became the chief administrative officer at JPMorgan Chase, later serving as the head of mortgage lending and its co-chief operating officer. In April 2013, Bisignano resigned from JPMorgan Chase to serve as the chief executive of First Data, a payments processing company. He became the president and chief operating officer of Fiserv after it acquired First Data in July 2019; a year later, he became Fiserv's chief executive officer.

In December 2024, President-elect Donald Trump named Bisignano as his nominee for commissioner of the Social Security Administration. He appeared before the Senate Committee on Finance in March 2025. The Senate confirmed Bisignano in May. In October, Secretary of the Treasury Scott Bessent appointed Bisignano as the chief executive officer of the Internal Revenue Service, a position that had not existed prior.

== Early life and education ==
Frank J. Bisignano was born on August 9, 1959. Bisignano was raised in Mill Basin, Brooklyn. He is the son and grandson of immigrants from Southern Italy; his father and grandfather served in the military. Bisignano's father was a customs agent, while his mother was a bookkeeper at a stevedoring company who later ran the company's operations. Bisignano graduated from Mary Queen of Heaven, a Catholic school in Mill Basin, and from Baker University, where he majored in finance and competed as a bowler.

== Career ==
=== Early business work (1985–2000) ===
In the 1980s and 1990s, Bisignano worked for the banker Sanford I. Weill. By 1985, he had begun working at Shearson Lehman Brothers. From 1986 to 1990, he served as a senior vice president at Shearson Lehman Brothers. Bisignano later became an executive vice president and chief consumer lending officer at First Fidelity Bancorporation. In 1994, Jamie Dimon hired Bisignano at Salomon Smith Barney as chief of operations. By 1998, Bisignano had become the co-head of global operations and technology at Smith Barney.

=== Citigroup (2000–2005) ===
By August 2000, Bisignano had become the head of global operations and information technology for Citigroup. That month, he was promoted to senior executive vice president and succeeded Robert Druskin as chief administrative officer. Bisignano led Citigroup's operations following the September 11 attacks. In August 2002, Bisignano's responsibilities expanded to include Citigroup's electronic commerce and transactions services businesses.

=== JPMorgan Chase (2005–2013) ===
In December 2005, JPMorgan Chase appointed Bisignano as its chief administrative officer. He was a lieutenant of Dimon, who was set to become JPMorgan Chase's chief executive the following month and whom Bisignano had met working for Sanford I. Weill. Bisignano garnered a reputation as a fixer and led JPMorgan Chase's absorption of Bear Stearns amid the 2008 financial crisis. He moved to consolidate several of JPMorgan Chase's offices in New York. Bisignano additionally led negotiations over JPMorgan Chase's London buildings while going through chemotherapy for throat cancer.

In February 2011, JPMorgan Chase named Bisignano to manage mortgage lending with the intent of revitalizing the business, which faced criticism from regulators over its foreclosure practices. His authority increased after the head of mortgage lending, David Lowman, was ousted. In July 2012, he was appointed as co-chief operating officer alongside Matt Zames. His responsibilities included technology and security. Bisignano was involved in the reorganization of JPMorgan Chase after a trading loss scandal. In December, he resigned as the head of mortgage lending.

=== First Data and Fiserv (2013–2025) ===
In April 2013, Bisignano resigned from JPMorgan Chase to serve as the chief executive of the payments company First Data. According to The New York Times, his resignation was voluntary and came amid other resignations following the trading loss scandal. Bisignano hired several JPMorgan Chase employees at First Data, leading to a hiring dispute; the company paid JPMorgan Chase less than US$10 million in January 2014 to settle the dispute. In an effort to salvage First Data's finances following its acquisition by KKR & Co. in 2007, Bisignano attempted several measures, including suspending 401(k) contributions in favor of stock options. His tenure marked a shift in the company's strategy from payment processing to client tooling. Bisignano sought to establish a partnership with Apple for its Apple Pay service and acquire start-ups, such as Clover Network, in separate efforts to revive the company.

According to The New York Times, Bisignano was the highest-paid financial chief executive in 2015 and the second-highest-paid chief executive overall in 2017. He filed for an initial public offering of First Data in July 2015. In July 2019, Fiserv acquired First Data. Bisignano became Fiserv's president and chief operating officer after the acquisition. A year later, he became chief executive of the company. According to the Milwaukee Journal Sentinel, Bisignano was the highest-paid executive in Wisconsin in 2023.

Bisignano resigned from his Fiserv positions in May 2025 after being confirmed as the commissioner of the Social Security Administration. He sold his holdings in the company after his confirmation to comply with a federal government ethics agreement. In October, the price of Fiserv's shares fell sharply after a weak financial earnings report; the sell-off prevented Bisignano from taking a loss of US$300 million. A class-action lawsuit filed earlier that year accused Bisignano and Fiserv of manipulating financial statistics, misleading investors. In November, Democratic senators Ron Wyden of Oregon and Elizabeth Warren of Massachusetts, the ranking members of the Senate Committees on Finance and Banking, respectively, began investigating Bisignano's stock sell-off.

=== Political activities (2016–present) ===
Bisignano supported Arizona senator John McCain's 2008 presidential campaign, although he donated US$4,600 to New York senator Hillary Clinton's presidential campaign that year. In December 2011, he co-hosted a fundraiser for former Massachusetts governor Mitt Romney's 2012 presidential campaign. In 2019, Bisignano donated over US$125,000 to Donald Trump's 2020 presidential campaign, and in November 2023, Bisignano gave US$15,000 to former New Jersey governor Chris Christie's 2024 presidential campaign; his wife, Tracy, donated over US$931,000 to Trump's 2024 campaign. Bisignano has supported several Democrats, including Senate minority leader Chuck Schumer and the sports manager Alex Lasry, who ran in the Democratic primary for the 2022 Senate election in Wisconsin.

=== Board memberships and awards ===
By December 2024, Bisignano had served on the boards of the National September 11 Memorial and Museum, the Mount Sinai Health System, and the Battery Conservancy, and was a member of the Business Roundtable. He received honorary degrees from Howard University, the New York Institute of Technology, St. Thomas Aquinas College, Syracuse University, and Baker University. In 2025, Bisignano was inducted into the New Jersey Hall of Fame.

== Commissioner of the Social Security Administration (2025–present) ==
=== Nomination and confirmation ===
On December 4, 2024, President-elect Donald Trump named Bisignano as his nominee for commissioner of the Social Security Administration. By February 2025, Bisignano's paperwork was still being reviewed by congressional aides. He appeared before the Senate Committee on Finance on March 25. Bisignano told the committee that he did not intend to privatize the agency. Oregon senator Ron Wyden, the committee's ranking member, pressed Bisignano on his relationship with the Department of Government Efficiency (DOGE) and its access to Social Security information. Wyden claimed that Bisignano had lied when he testified that he had no contact with DOGE. The Senate Committee on Finance voted 14–13 along party lines to advance his nomination. On May 6, the Senate voted to confirm Bisignano in a 53–47 vote along party lines.

=== Tenure ===
In an address to managers two weeks after being sworn in, Bisignano stated that he would not implement mass layoffs immediately to ensure the "right level of staffing", but praised the use of artificial intelligence and suggested that the DOGE could benefit the agency. He succeeded Leland Dudek, whose term as acting commissioner was affected by the DOGE's efforts to gain access to the agency's databases and codebases. Bisignano rejected senior advisor Elon Musk's claim that forty percent of inbound calls to the Social Security Administration were from scammers, but told The New York Times that DOGE's work was "one hundred percent accurate".

== Chief Executive Officer of the Internal Revenue Service (2025–present) ==
In October, Secretary of the Treasury Scott Bessent, who had been named as the acting commissioner of internal revenue after Billy Long's resignation in anticipation of an ambassadorship, named Bisignano as the chief executive of the Internal Revenue Service, a position that did not exist previously. Bisignano's tenure came amid concerns from employees that the Trump administration was deliberately damaging the Internal Revenue Service. His appointment elicited concerns from some Democrats, who argued that the position might be unconstitutional. In January 2026, days before the beginning of the tax season, Bisignano moved to reorganize the agency to directly oversee compliance work alongside Jarod Koopman. He appointed Koopman the chief of the Internal Revenue Service Criminal Investigation, despite public statements from Gary Shapley, the division's deputy chief, that he would become the chief that year. As the chief executive officer of the Internal Revenue Service, Bisignano signed an agreement with the Department of Justice establishing the Anti-Weaponization Fund. On July 15, 2026, Secretary Bessent tapped Bisignano to lead the expansion phase of Trump Accounts. In October 2026, the Treasury Department created Trump Accounts for nearly 70 million children.

== Works cited ==
- Abelson, Max (July 30, 2012). "Zames Rises From JPMorgan Battlefield to Dimon's War Council". Bloomberg News.
- Abrams, Rachel (January 27, 2014). "Former JPMorgan Executive Said to Settle Hiring Dispute". The New York Times.
- Andrea, Lawrence (May 6, 2025). "Senate confirms Fiserv's Frank Bisignano to lead Social Security on a party-line vote". Milwaukee Journal Sentinel.
- Baer, Max (July 11, 2011). "JPMorgan hires HP executive for property". Financial Times.
- Banerjee, Devin; Chen, Caroline (June 19, 2014). "Kravis Bolsters KKR's Biggest Deal With First Data Boost". Bloomberg News.
- Benoit, David (February 11, 2011). "J.P. Morgan Shuffles Management of Home-Lending Arm". The Wall Street Journal.
- Benoit, David (April 29, 2013). "KKR's First Data Turns to J.P. Morgan's Mr. Fix It". The Wall Street Journal.
- Berzon, Alexandra; Nehamas, Nicholas; Siegel Bernard, Tara (June 16, 2025). "The Bureaucrat and the Billionaire: Inside DOGE's Chaotic Takeover of Social Security". The New York Times.
- Bolton, Alexander (March 25, 2025). "Democratic senator grills Trump nominee over DOGE access to Social Security systems". The Hill.
- Braithwaite, Tom (December 18, 2012). "JPMorgan names head of mortgage business". Financial Times.
- "Citigroup Makes Changes in a Global Banking Unit". The New York Times. Reuters. August 16, 2002.
- "Citigroup Names Insider Druskin As Operating, Technology Chief". The Wall Street Journal. August 30, 2000.
- Carey, David (September 16, 2014). "KKR Banks on Bisignano to Revive First Data With Apple Deal". Bloomberg News.
- Dennis, Steven (November 7, 2025). "Democrats Probe Trump Social Security Chief's Tie to Fiserv Fall". Bloomberg News.
- Dexheimer, Elizabeth (July 29, 2015). "First Data's Loss Narrows as Revenue Increases Ahead of IPO". Bloomberg News.
- Duehren, Andrew; Farrell, Maureen (October 30, 2025). "A Top Trump Official Had to Sell His Stock. He May Have Saved Millions". The New York Times.
- Duehren, Andrew (January 26, 2026). "Trump Hobbled the I.R.S. This C.E.O. Now Has to Make It Work". The New York Times.
- Duehren, Andrew (May 19, 2026). "The I.R.S. Thought It Could Fight Trump's Lawsuit, but It Reached a Deal Anyway". The New York Times.
- Gelles, David (May 29, 2016). "Top C.E.O. Pay Fell — Yes, Fell — in 2015". The New York Times.
- Gordon, Amanda (April 13, 2012). "Scene Last Night: JPMorgan's Bisignano, Debra Messing". Bloomberg News.
- Gordon, Amanda (April 8, 2015). "Scene Last Night: Bisignano, Cuomo, Weill, Nuttall for Plumeri". Bloomberg News.
- Guerrera, Francesco (February 11, 2011). "JPMorgan taps new head of US mortgage unit". Financial Times.
- Guerrera, Francesco (February 14, 2011). "'Frankie B' takes pivotal role in JPMorgan". Financial Times.
- Fitzpatrick, Dan (April 28, 2013). "Dimon Loses Key Lieutenant". The Wall Street Journal.
- Hager, Eli (September 8, 2025). "The Untold Saga of What Happened When DOGE Stormed Social Security". ProPublica.
- Hall, Jessica (April 2, 2025). "Social Security Commissioner nominee advances despite whistleblower allegations". MarketWatch.
- Hamill, Denis (October 5, 2010). "Fund-raiser helps Catholic schools continue to provide superior education for students". New York Daily News.
- Heckman, Jory (May 21, 2025). "SSA chief expects no mass layoffs to get to 'right level of staffing,' calls on DOGE to drive 'digital-first' agency". Federal News Network.
- "The Highest-Paid C.E.O.s in 2017". The New York Times. May 25, 2018.
- "J.P. Morgan Hires Citigroup's Bisignano". The Wall Street Journal. December 5, 2005.
- "JPMorgan's Expanding Footprint". The New York Times. March 16, 2008.
- Kim, Minho (December 4, 2024). "Trump Picks Banking Executive to Lead Social Security Administration". The New York Times.
- Kopecki, Dawn (February 11, 2011). "JPMorgan Taps Bisignano to Oversee Home Lending". Bloomberg News.
- Kremer, Rich (December 5, 2024). "Trump taps Fiserv CEO to lead Social Security Administration". Wisconsin Public Radio.
- Maloney, Tom; Sloan, Dylan (October 29, 2025). "Frank Bisignano Ducks $300 Million Fiserv Loss With Move to Trump Role". Bloomberg News.
- Marcinek, Laura; Keoun, Bradley (November 29, 2011). "JPMorgan Executives Plan Romney New York Fundraiser Next Month". Bloomberg News.
- McCracken, Jeffrey; Nichols, Hans (July 27, 2012). "JPMorgan Promotex Zames to Co-COO Amid Bank Restructuring". Bloomberg News.
- Moore, Kristina (November 16, 1998). "Second ops pro quits Salomon Smith Barney". Operations Management. Vol. 4, no. 46.
- Peck, Eric (December 5, 2024). "Trump Taps Fiserv Head as Social Security Commissioner". MortgagePoint.
- Picker, Leslie; de la Merced, Michael (October 14, 2015). "Companies Eyeing Public Offerings Reckon With Inhospitable Market". The New York Times.
- Reid, Claire (December 5, 2024). "Here's a look at Fiserv CEO Frank Bisignano, just named commissioner of Social Security Administration". Milwaukee Journal Sentinel.
- Rein, Lisa (February 22, 2025). "New Social Security chief was being investigated when Musk team tapped him". The Washington Post.
- Rein, Lisa (May 25, 2025). "Social Security nominee falsely claims no DOGE contacts, Democratic senator says". The Washington Post.
- Schwartz, Brian; Rubin, Richard (October 6, 2025). "Bessent Picks Social Security Chief Frank Bisignano as IRS CEO". The Wall Street Journal.
- Seal, Dean; Heeb, Gina; Glickman, Ben (October 29, 2025). "Fiserv Erases $30 Billion in Market Value After New CEO Pulls Guidance". The Wall Street Journal.
- Sentner, Irie (August 9, 2026). "What we saw in Wisconsin". Politico.
- Sidel, Robin; Lublin, Joann (July 15, 2013). "KKR-Owned First Data to Suspend 401(k) Contributions". The Wall Street Journal.
- Sidel, Robin; Fitzpatrick, Dan (January 27, 2014). "J.P. Morgan's Dimon, Ex-Ally Settle Dispute". The Wall Street Journal.
- Siegel Bernard, Tara; Berzon, Alexandra (March 25, 2025). "Trump's Pick to Lead Social Security Administration Is Grilled About Privatization". The New York Times.
- Silver-Greenberg, Jessica (April 28, 2013). "Top Lieutenant of Dimon Is Departing JPMorgan". The New York Times.
- Taschler, Joe (May 7, 2020). "Fiserv announces CEO succession plan; Bisignano to take over top job on July 1". Milwaukee Journal Sentinel.
- Tully, Shawn (May 24, 2020). "This Jamie Dimon protege has weathered six crises. Here is his coronavirus playbook". Fortune.
- Wen, Eva; Jaeger, Zoe; Spivak, Cary (October 17, 2024). "Wisconsin's public companies must disclose how much they pay CEOs. Here's who topped the list". Milwaukee Journal Sentinel.
- "Who's Who in Treasury and Cash Management". Global Finance. Vol. 19, no. 8. September 2005.

Political offices
Preceded by Leland Dudek; Acting	Commissioner of the Social Security Administration; 2025–present	Incumbent
