= Economy Act of March 20, 1933 =

United States federal law that cut federal salaries and reduced veterans' benefits

The Economy Act of 1933, officially titled the Act of March 20, 1933 (ch. 3, Pub. L. 73–2, 48 Stat. 8, enacted March 20, 1933, is an Act of Congress that cut the salaries of federal workers and reduced benefit payments to veterans, moves intended to reduce the federal deficit in the United States.

The Economy Act of 1933 is sometimes confused with the Economy Act of 1932, which was signed in the final days of the Hoover administration in February 1933. This Hoover-sponsored bill established the purchasing authority of the federal government. Title VI of this earlier act authorized heads of executive departments, establishments, bureaus, and offices to place orders with any other such Federal agency unless the requisitioned goods or services could be acquired as conveniently or more cheaply from the private sector. Though amended several times, this provision—commonly referred to simply as the Economy Act—remains in force as of 2019 (31 U.S.C. § 1535).

== Enactment ==
As Governor of New York, Franklin D. Roosevelt had campaigned for the Presidency, in part, on a pledge to balance the federal budget. On March 10, 1933, six days after his inauguration, Roosevelt submitted legislation to Congress which would cut $500 million ($8.181 billion in 2009 dollars) from the $3.6 billion federal budget by eliminating government agencies, reducing the pay of civilian and military federal workers (including members of Congress), and slashing veterans' benefits by 50 percent. Veterans benefits constituted a quarter of the federal budget at the time. The Act was written primarily by Lewis Douglas, Roosevelt's Director of the Budget, and Grenville Clark, a private attorney.

The Act faced stiff opposition in the Congress. On June 17, 1932, the Bonus Army (about 17,000 World War I veterans and 26,000 of their family members and affiliated groups) had established a Hooverville shanty town on the Anacostia Flats area of Washington, D.C. On July 28, the U.S. 12th Infantry Regiment commanded by General Douglas MacArthur and the 3rd Cavalry Regiment (supported by six tanks) commanded by Major George S. Patton attacked and set afire the Bonus Army's encampment, injuring hundreds and killing several veterans and civilians.

Congress was forced to flee the city for several days after outraged veterans ringed the United States Capitol. The political backlash caused by the attack on the Bonus Army led to the defeat of several members of Congress that fall. Many in Congress, remembering the incident, did not want to support the Economy Act. The House Democratic Caucus even refused to support the bill. Heavily opposed by liberal Democrats (92 of whom voted against it), the bill passed the House of Representatives only with heavy support of Republicans and conservative Democrats.

The bill easily passed the Senate only because the Senate Democratic Caucus had scheduled a vote on the popular Cullen-Harrison Act (to amend the Volstead Act to allow the manufacture and sale of beer and light wines) immediately after the vote on the Economy Act—allowing Senators to cast vote for one very unpopular bill and one very popular bill in quick succession.

The President signed the Economy Act into law on March 20, 1933.

== Provisions and impact ==
The Economy Act cut federal spending by $243 million, not the $500 million requested by the President. This aspect of the Act proved deflationary as the government purchased fewer goods and services, and some argue that this led to a worsening of the Great Depression. The act also halved Supreme Court pensions and two of the four anti-New Deal Supreme Court justices, Willis Van Devanter and George Sutherland, refused to retire, remained on the bench, and struck down some of Roosevelt's recovery acts; Supreme Court pensions were originally halved in 1932 but had been temporarily restored by Congress to full pay in February 1933. These two justices would likely have retired from the Supreme Court early into Roosevelt's first term if their pensions had not been halved.

The Economy Act also gave the President limited authority to reorganize executive branch agencies to achieve efficiency, but this power was not utilized much before the Act expired in 1935. By March 3, 1935, Roosevelt had issued 27 reorganization orders, most of them minor in nature. Roosevelt did not engage in extensive reorganization efforts until the passage of the Reorganization Act of 1939 gave him that authority.

Its most important provisions, however, repealed all federal laws regarding veterans' benefits.

Section 17 of the Act declared: "All public laws granting medical or hospital treatment, domiciliary care, compensation, and other allowances, pension, disability allowance, or retirement pay to veterans and the dependents of veterans of ... the World War ... are hereby repealed, and all laws granting or pertaining to yearly renewable term insurance are hereby repealed." However, the Act allowed the president to re-establish these benefits for two years via executive order at levels the President deemed appropriate.

Benefits for non-disabled veterans fell more than 40%, creating deep resentment among former soldiers and officers and leading to the establishment of the Veterans of Foreign Wars as a major force in American politics. The Economy Act caused a second Bonus Army to form, but Roosevelt handled this protest much more carefully than Hoover had: His administration set up an encampment for the protesters (albeit too far from the Capitol to make their protest effective), prohibited loitering in the District of Columbia (forcing the marchers to stay outside the city), sent Eleanor Roosevelt to deliver food and medicine to the marchers and hear their grievances, and encouraged the ex-servicemen to seek work with the Civilian Conservation Corps (which many did).

Veterans nonetheless sued to have their benefits restored. In Lynch v. United States, 292 U.S. 571 (1934) and United States v. Jackson, 302 U.S. 628 (1938), the Supreme Court of the United States ruled that Congress had violated federal law in eliminating certain insurance guarantees formerly offered to veterans by the War Risk Insurance Act (as amended December 24, 1919; Chapter 16, Section 12, 41 Stat. 371), and those benefits were restored.

The Economy Act had little effect on either the federal deficit or the economy. Spending in other areas rose so substantially that it dwarfed the cuts imposed by the Economy Act. The benefit cuts also did not last. In June 1933, Roosevelt restored $50 million in pension payments, and Congress added another $46 million. In January 1934, Roosevelt added another $21 million for veterans whose disabilities were service-connected but not service-caused. In March 1934, Congress overrode Roosevelt's veto and added another $90 million in veterans benefits and $120 million to federal workers' salaries. In October 1934, Roosevelt restored $60 million in federal salary cuts, and restored cuts to veterans who had served in the Spanish–American War, Philippine–American War, and Boxer Rebellion.
