= Department of Government Efficiency =

Defunct US government agency

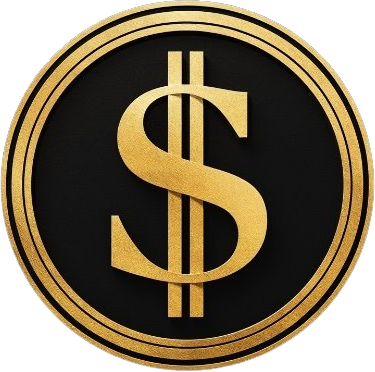
- Logo from 2025-2026
- Predecessor: United States Digital Service
- Formation: January 20, 2025; 21 months ago
- Dissolved: July 4, 2026; 4 months ago
- Type: Cross-departmental temporary organization
- Headquarters: Eisenhower Executive Office Building, Washington, D.C., U.S.
- Administrator: Amy Gleason (acting)
- Key people: Elon Musk (de facto leader in an unofficial capacity and Senior Advisor to the President for Government Efficiency); Steve Davis (described as informally acting as the chief of staff and deputy leader to Musk, effectively ran day-to-day operations)
- Parent organization: Executive Office of the President
- Budget: c. $40 million
- Website: doge.gov

The Department of Government Efficiency (DOGE) (Note: Pronounced /doʊ(d)ʒ/ DOHJ, DOHZH) was a United States federal initiative launched by the second Trump administration. It was first suggested to Donald Trump by Elon Musk in 2024, established by an executive order on January 20, 2025, and ceased operation on July 4, 2026, as scheduled. Its stated objective was to modernize information technology and maximize productivity within the federal government. Members of DOGE filled influential roles within several federal agencies, where they obtained administrative access to information systems used in procurement and personnel management, terminated certain government contracts, and facilitated mass layoffs and staff reductions. DOGE personnel also assisted with immigration enforcement. Reports indicated that DOGE accessed and copied public and classified data from government databases to private servers as part of its operational activities, prompting scrutiny regarding data handling and oversight.

DOGE's status was unclear. Formerly designated as the U.S. Digital Service, USDS abbreviated United States DOGE Service and comprised the United States DOGE Service Temporary Organization. The Supreme Court has exempted it from disclosure, although Musk has said that DOGE was transparent. DOGE's actions have been met with opposition and lawsuits, with some critics warning of a constitutional crisis, and others likening DOGE's actions to a coup. Several of its actions were found to be illegal and potentially unconstitutional, and were rebuked by federal judges. (Note: In court cases, judges found many of DOGE's actions to be illegal and potentially unconstitutional.) The White House has insisted on the lawfulness of DOGE's activities.

The role Musk had with DOGE is also unclear. The White House asserted he was senior advisor to the president, denied he was making decisions, and named Amy Gleason as acting administrator. Trump insisted that Musk headed DOGE. A federal judge found him to be DOGE's de facto leader, likely needing Senate confirmation under the Appointments Clause. In May 2025, Musk announced plans to pivot away from DOGE. Musk left Washington on May 30, soon after his offboarding, along with lieutenant Steve Davis, top adviser Katie Miller, and general counsel James Burnham. Trump had maintained his support for Musk until they clashed in June over passage of the Big Beautiful Bill. His administration reiterated its pledge to the DOGE objective, and Russell Vought said DOGE was being institutionalized, a claim that Scott Kupor corroborated in November 2025.

DOGE has claimed to have saved hundreds of billions, although a Senate Minority staff report estimated it cost the government $21.7 billion. Another independent analysis estimated that DOGE cuts will cost taxpayers $135 billion; the Internal Revenue Service predicted more than $500 billion in revenue loss due to "DOGE-driven" cuts. Journalists found billions of dollars in miscounting. According to critics, DOGE redefined fraud to target federal employees and programs to build political support; budget experts said DOGE cuts were driven more by political ideology than frugality. Musk, DOGE, and the Trump administration have made multiple claims of having discovered significant fraud, many of which have not held up under scrutiny. According to the estimates of Brooke Nichols, DOGE cuts to foreign aid programs had led to around 300,000 deaths by May 2025, mostly of children. By February 2026, when her counter that estimated the number of deaths was retired, the numbers were kept at the one-year mark from when the cuts began: 781,343 deaths caused by the funding discontinuation.

== Background ==
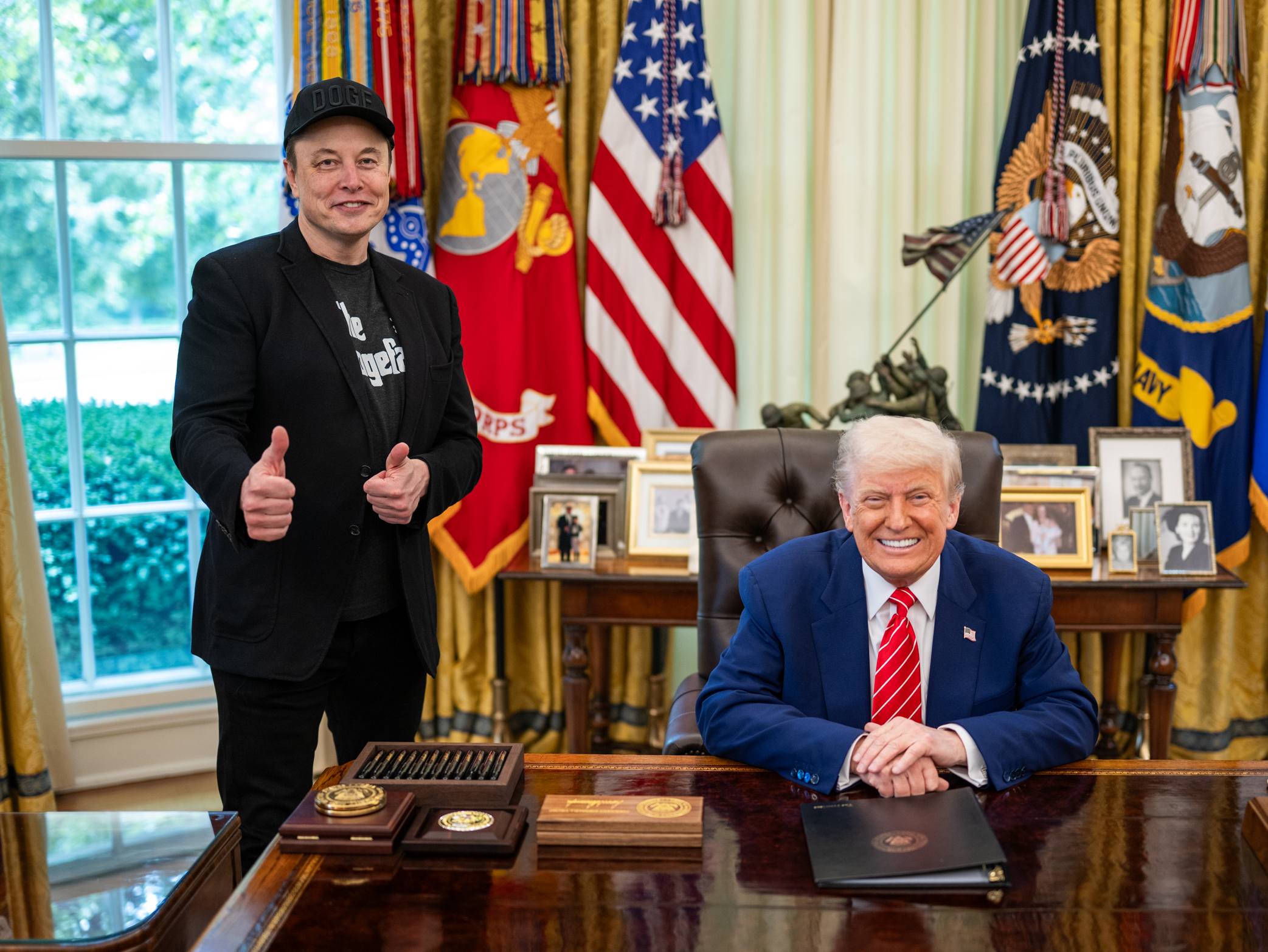
Elon Musk and Donald Trump in 2025

After financially backing President Donald Trump and other Republican Party politicians since 2023, Elon Musk became the largest individual donor of the 2024 election cycle. He spent more than US$290 million in campaign contributions. In September 2024, he described deregulation as the only path to his Mars colonization program. In October, he appeared on Trump's stage with an "Occupy Mars" t-shirt.

On September 5, 2024, Trump promised to the Economic Club of New York:

At the suggestion of Elon Musk [...] I will create a Government Efficiency Commission tasked with conducting a complete financial and performance audit of the entire federal government and making recommendations for drastic reforms.

Javier Milei revealed that, prior to the public declaration, Musk had called Federico Sturzenegger to discuss emulating his ministry's deregulation model in the United States.

In November 2024, The New York Times initially compared the project's stated aims to Theodore Roosevelt's Keep Commission, Ronald Reagan's Grace Commission, and Al Gore's National Partnership for Reinventing Government.

=== Origin ===
Musk mentioned having proposed a "government efficiency commission" to Trump during an interview in the summer of 2024. Soon after that, he brought it up during a discussion with Trump on Musk's social media platform X. That month, Trump said that he would be open to giving Musk an advisory role. The next day, an X user suggested the name "Department of Government Efficiency" for the new initiative; Musk replied "That is the perfect name", and posted "I am willing to serve" with an AI-created image of him in front of a lectern marked "D.O.G.E." The DOGE acronym refers to an internet meme of a Shiba Inu dog and to Dogecoin, a meme coin that Musk promotes, making "Department of Government Efficiency" a backronym.

Days after the election, a small group, including Musk, Vivek Ramaswamy, Howard Lutnick, and Brad Smith, started meeting at Mar-a-Lago. On November 12, Trump announced that Musk and Ramaswamy would lead DOGE and analogized it to the Manhattan Project. During an interview with Tucker Carlson on the same day, Musk proposed consolidating the 400 federal agencies: "99 [...] is more than enough". Musk and Ramaswamy co-authored an op-ed in The Wall Street Journal three days later arguing for the need to reduce the size of government.

At a Trump campaign rally in Madison Square Garden in October 2024, Musk said he thought DOGE could reduce federal spending by "at least" $2 trillion, a figure higher than the 2023 discretionary spending budget. At the first cabinet meeting of the second Trump administration in February, Musk remained optimistic that $1 trillion–15% of the budget–could be cut. In April 2025, Musk stated that at that time $150 billion had been cut, but this figure was disputed by fact-checkers, and House DOGE caucus leader Blake Moore said on June 5 that Republican members always knew it was a "massive exaggeration". In October, after the fiscal year had ended, the New York Times reported that budget experts and congressional appropriators still didn't know how much funding had been cut or where those unused funds had gone.

=== Self-deletion date ===
On December 2, 2024, Ramaswamy posted that "Most government projects should come with a clear expiry date"; Musk replied that the final step of DOGE was "to delete itself". Trump stated that the entity's work will "conclude" no later than July 4, 2026. This termination will coincide with a "Great American Fair" that Trump has proposed for the 250th anniversary of the United States. Trump called the promised results "the perfect gift to America".

Trump's January 20 order on DOGE (E.O. 14158) created and divided DOGE into a permanent part and a temporary part. However, it remains unclear what exactly the temporary part consisted of.

=== Ramaswamy steps away ===
Trump and Musk discuss DOGE in the Oval Office, February 2025.

After the second inauguration of Trump on January 20, the White House confirmed that Ramaswamy would not join DOGE. The announcement came after reports surfaced about internal friction between Ramaswamy and DOGE staff. A Republican strategist stated that Ramaswamy was wanted out of D.C. after his X post on how Americans "venerated mediocrity over excellence". Sources close to Ramaswamy said that he left DOGE to focus on his upcoming campaign for governor of Ohio.

=== Early claims of fraud ===
On November 12, 2024, Trump announced that DOGE would work with the Office of Management and Budget to address what he called "massive waste and fraud" in government spending. Less than a week into his presidency, Trump dismissed 17 inspectors general, whose job was to audit federal agencies. Some of these inspectors were leading investigations, pending legal action against Elon Musk's companies.

During his speech to a joint session of Congress, Trump brought up DOGE, March 2025

Trump said DOGE discovered "billions and billions of dollars in waste, fraud and abuse". Musk suggested that 20 million people received Social Security past age 100, which he later called "the biggest fraud in history"; that claim rests on a misunderstanding of the database. Karoline Leavitt asserted the day after that the DOGE Subcommittee discovered $2.7 trillion in improper Medicaid and Medicare payments to people overseas. Musk shared the claim on his social media. Since then the claim has been refuted. Two judges rebuked the Trump administration a few days later for alleging fraud without evidence.

In his Joint Congressional Address on March 4, 2025, Trump repeated Musk's claim about people of implausible ages receiving social security benefits. In March 2025, Musk suggested that those who criticize DOGE are fraudsters.

== Structure ==
On January 20, 2025, Trump established by executive order the "U.S. Department of Government Efficiency". Specifically, he announced a DOGE structure that consists of: (a) the U.S. Digital Service (USDS) as the U.S. DOGE Service; (b) the U.S. DOGE Service Temporary Organization, an entity within USDS intended to terminate on July 4, 2026; and (c) DOGE teams that coordinate with other agencies. The new USDS is declared to have "full and prompt access to all unclassified agency records, software systems and IT systems" to the "maximum extent consistent with law". Trump later issued many other executive orders that mention DOGE.

=== DOGE teams ===
The first executive order (E.O. 14158) introduced the concept of a "DOGE team" and called for the implementation of an unspecified DOGE agenda. (Note: The expression "DOGE agenda" is used three times in the text of the first executive order (E.O. 14158). The first (Sect. 1) is to state that DOGE is established to "implement the President's DOGE Agenda"; the second (Sect. 3b) to state that the DOGE temporary organization "shall be dedicated to advancing the President's 18-month DOGE agenda"; the third (Sect. 3c) to state that DOGE Team leads "coordinate their work with USDS and advise their respective Agency Heads on implementing the President's DOGE Agenda." Executive order 14222 does not mention the DOGE agenda, but rather refers to a "cost efficiency initiative".) Such team consists of at least four employees and typically includes a team lead, one engineer, one human resources specialist, and one attorney. Members of DOGE teams, who may be special government employees, are embedded in all federal agencies and are determined by agency heads, in consultation with the USDS administrator (E.O. 14158 Sect. 3c).

New career appointments at each federal agency are to be made in consultation with the agency's DOGE team lead, who also plays a role in determining whether career appointment vacancies will be filled. The team lead provides the USDS administrator with a monthly hiring report (E.O. 14210, 3b).

Executive order 14222 Sect. 3a tasks DOGE teams with assisting agencies in the elaboration of "a centralized technological system" to record every payment issued by the agency, along with justification by the employee who approved it; this system shall also give agency heads a kill switch to override decisions.

=== USDS administrator ===
The USDS administrator, a position currently held on an acting basis by Amy Gleason, reports to the White House chief of staff. The administrator also heads the DOGE temporary organization. The administrator's work includes heading a government-wide software modernization initiative. The listed responsibilities include working with agency heads both to promote the interoperability of agency systems and to enable USDS access to unclassified agency records and systems. The administrator is also tasked (with others) with developing a federal hiring plan for agency heads and providing advice regarding its implementation. Within 240 days of February 11, 2025, the administrator is to provide the president with a report about the implementation of his workforce optimization initiative, including "a recommendation as to whether any of its provisions should be extended, modified, or terminated."

=== Related executive orders ===
Trump has issued several executive orders mentioning DOGE, either to constitute it, to establish its mandate, or to ask agencies to cooperate with its members:

- On January 20, executive order 14158, "Establishing and Implementing the President's 'Department of Government Efficiency'", established various DOGE entities.
- On January 20, executive order 14170, "Reforming the Federal Hiring Process and Restoring Merit to Government Service", asked his assistant for domestic policy to produce a hiring plan in consultation with the Office of Management and Budget (OMB) director, the Office of Personnel Management (OPM) director, and the DOGE administrator.
- On February 11, executive order 14210, "Implementing the President's 'Department of Government Efficiency' Workforce Optimization Initiative", ordered significant reductions in workforce.
- On February 19, executive order 14218, "Ending Taxpayer Subsidization of Open Borders", ordered the OMB and the USDS directors to identify funding sources and to enhance eligibility verification systems for undocumented immigrants.
- On February 19, executive order 14219, "Ensuring Lawful Governance and Implementing the President's 'Department of Government Efficiency' Regulatory Initiative", ordered agency heads to review all the laws that fall under their jurisdiction, with an eye toward deregulation.
- On February 26, executive order 14222, "Implementing the President's 'Department of Government Efficiency' Cost Efficiency Initiative", issued directives to transform the registration of contracts, grants, and loans.
- On April 9, executive order 14270, "Zero-Based Regulatory Budgeting To Unleash American Energy", directed environment and energy agencies to coordinate with DOGE team leads and the OMB director to incorporate a sunset provision into their regulations.
- On May 23, executive order 14300, "Ordering the Reform of the Nuclear Regulatory Commission", commanding the Nuclear Regulatory Commission to coordinate with OMB and DOGE to plan downsizing and deregulation.

== Network ==
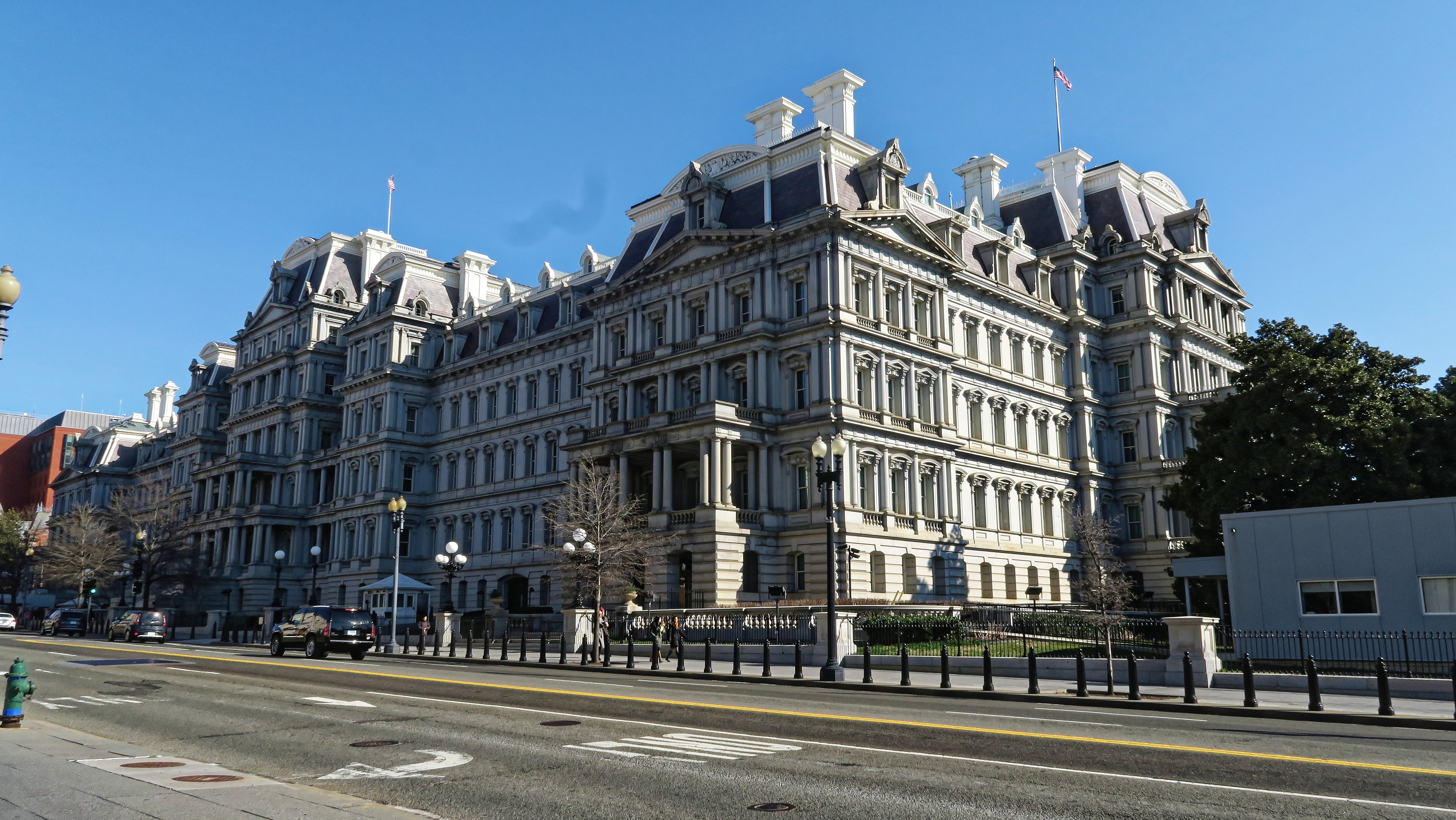
DOGE affiliates worked at the Eisenhower Executive Office Building.

The network of the Department of Government Efficiency consists of affiliates and allies associated with the Department of Government Efficiency (DOGE) in the second presidency of Donald Trump.

Though the identities of DOGE personnel have not been officially disclosed, investigative journalists have reported that its staff included young programmers without government experience. Roughly 40 affiliates are tied to Musk; others come from Silicon Valley, the Trump administration, and the conservative legal movement. In July 2025, ProPublica tracked down more than 100 DOGE staffers, of whom at least 23 made staffing cuts to agencies that regulated industries in which they had previously worked.

== Working conditions ==
On February 2, 2025, Musk said on Twitter that DOGE workers were putting in 120 hours a week. This was questioned for leaving dangerously little time to sleep. In May 2025 a DOGE worker told Jesse Watters "There's one group of people who really have a shot at success, and it's the people here. They're up until 2 am, Monday to Sunday. DOGE does not recognize weekends."

Some DOGE workers appear to live at least part time at the office. At the headquarters of the General Services Administration (GSA), DOGE converted a number of offices on the sixth floor into sleeping quarters. Anonymous GSA staff have alleged that the family of at least one DOGE staffer was living on the sixth floor, where beds, lamps and dressers were installed in four separate sleeping rooms. Musk told multiple people he had slept at the Eisenhower Executive Office Building that housed the Office of Management and Budget. The Associated Press obtained photos of Starlink transceivers, wired to the top floor of the headquarters.

== Budget ==
At the time of its announcement, DOGE's budget was unknown, and several of the employees were expected to be unpaid volunteers. By February 20, 2025, DOGE's budget was nearly $40 million. DOGE's funding has come from other federal agencies in the form of transfer payments allowed by the Economy Act of 1932. This form of payment implies that DOGE has been treated like a federal agency by the Trump administration. Government experts writing in the Yale Journal on Regulation underline the dilemma: "The Trump administration's view is untenable. USDS is either an agency or it is not. And if USDS, as seems apparent, is doing more than advising the President and is instead wielding independent authority, then it faces a more fundamental challenge to its existence: no statute created USDS or vested it with the power it now appears to wield".

DOGE has asked the Office of Personnel Management (OPM) to pay for 20 full-time DOGE employees at the highest federal pay grade to modernize its information systems; the terms stipulate that OPM must pay each month in advance, and give DOGE access to its data and systems, as well as provide "operational and technical support". At the current employment rates, this would mean $4.1 million for the work between January 20 and July 4, 2026.

At least three DOGE employees are drawing salaries from the General Services Administration (GSA): Jeremy Lewin ($167,000), Kyle Schutt ($195,200), and Nate Cavanaugh ($120,500). According to DOGE's website, the average GSA employee has been at the agency for 13 years and makes $128,565.

According to Wired, as of June 2025, potential recruits were being told that a DOGE salary ranged between $120,000 and $195,000.

An agreement between the Department of Labor (DOL) and USDS, backdated to the inauguration day, would reportedly pay $1.3 million for the work equivalent of four DOGE members, about 10% more per employee than the top annual career civil servant salary.

To cover for DOGE costs during its first week, $6.75 million was apportioned to DOGE from the Information Technology Oversight and Reform (ITOR) account that funded the legacy USDS. Rep. Rosa DeLauro (D-CT) observed that this was "nearly twice the annual salaries and expenses budget of the White House". DOGE also has a Treasury account, separate from ITOR. From January 30 to February 8, DOGE's budget had more than doubled to $14.4 million; filings show that the added $7.7 million was reserved "for anticipated reimbursements from agencies in support of Software Modernization Initiative".

Politico reported that the U.S. DOGE Service (USDS), the agency where DOGE is embedded, had 89 employees in 2025, and planned to increase staff to 150 in 2026. Official documents revealed that for the 2025 fiscal year, USDS had a budget of $20 million, and requested a $45 million for fiscal 2026.

In March, Russell Vought removed the apportionments database from OMB's website; the Government Accountability Office wrote in disagreement, and Protect Democracy Project sued the administration, arguing it was the only source of public information on DOGE funding.

== Purpose ==
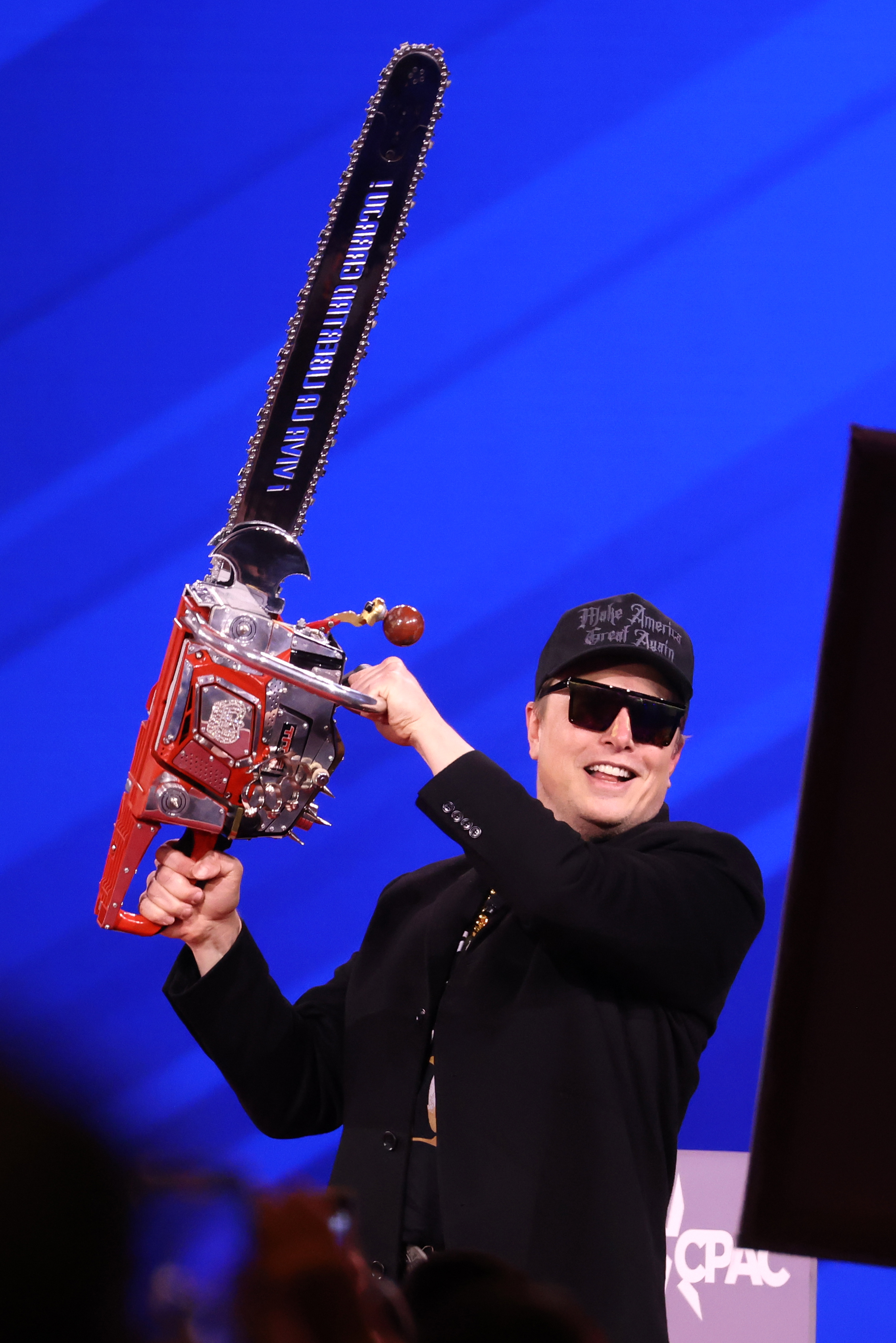
Musk swings the "Chainsaw for Bureaucracy" at CPAC 2025.

Proponents of DOGE have described it as a project to make the government smaller and more efficient by cutting government spending and downsizing the federal workforce. Critics have described DOGE as a project to make the federal government conform to the Trump administration's political ideology. DOGE has outlined a plan to purge federal agencies of diversity, equity, and inclusion (DEI). The plan calls for large-scale firing, including removal of any employee deemed DEI-adjacent. While executing its plan, DOGE has gained pervasive access to government data. Its takeover of federal infrastructure is such that it holds information about American citizens, public properties, scientific datasets, official websites, financial records, classified material, and federal contracts; it gained the capacity to terminate programs, destroy data, and contact every federal employee, including judges. DOGE's agenda maps onto Project 2025 goals.

=== Controlling US government digital systems ===
DOGE has attempted to control, at times successfully, US government digital systems. Three weeks into the second Trump presidency, TechCrunch observed that DOGE had "gained unprecedented access to a swath of U.S. government departments—including agencies responsible for managing data on millions of federal employees and a system that handles $6 trillion in payments to Americans."

==== Chief information officer ====
The role of chief information officers (CIO) had not been consistently implemented across government departments and time. CIO positions have been filled through political and career appointments. On February 4, 2025, OPM recommended that CIOs be filled via political appointment. The following CIOs are either connected to Musk or Peter Thiel: the Office of Management and Budget (OMB) had Gregory Barbaccia, from Palantir; OPM had Greg Hogan, from SpaceX; DOE had Ryan Riedel from SpaceX, and Ross Graber, from Twitter; the Social Security Administration (SSA) had Michael Russo.

==== Office of Personnel Management (OPM) ====
By Trump's first day in office, DOGE member Amanda Scales was chief of staff at the Office of Personnel Management (OPM). OPM manages more than $1 trillion in assets, retirement funds, health and life insurance benefits for federal employees and their spouses; it also provides custody to service records of 2.1 million workers and citizens who have applied for federal jobs, and maintains an email list of nearly every federal employee. DOGE revoked database access to senior OPM staff on January 30, 2025.

==== General Services Administration (GSA) ====
Musk lieutenant Steve Davis and other DOGE team members have occupied a level of the GSA headquarters from February to May; the agency has been described as "a choke point for all agencies" by Steven Schooner, a George Washington University law school professor who specializes in government contracting. The agency holds data about federal real estate, procurement, and information infrastructure; according to a former director, it holds "incredible amounts of sensitive or proprietary business information that [businesses] had to share with the government in order to get a contract or take some action". It manages the SmartPay system, the largest government charge card and commercial payment program in the world. It also oversees the Federal Procurement Data System (FPDS), which details every contract action over $3,000; DOGE has had the power to modify its records since before February 14, the day they promised "receipts".

On February 18, 2025, Steven Reilly resigned from leading the engineering of notify.gov after the new GSA director Thomas Shedd requested administrator access to the service along with twenty other GSA systems.

==== Department of Treasury (USDT) ====
Donald Trump comments on Elon Musk's access to payment systems, February 2025.

On January 21, David Lebryk denied DOGE access to USDT systems. Newly confirmed Treasury secretary Scott Bessent overruled that decision later that day, and Lebryk resigned. He was replaced by Tom Krause, a DOGE member who kept his role of CEO at the Cloud Software Group.

On February 13, DOGE entered the Internal Revenue Service (IRS), whose parent agency is the Department of Treasury. Two days later, DOGE was seeking access to the Integrated Data Retrieval System. USDT (through IRS) has names, addresses, social security numbers from taxpayers, their income and net worth, bank information for direct deposits, itemization details such as charitable donations, bankruptcy history or identity theft.

==== Social Security Administration (SSA) ====
On February 18, Michelle King either stepped down from her role as SSA acting commissioner or was fired. She was replaced by Leland Dudek, an employee of the agency who, days earlier, had written on LinkedIn about being put on leave due to his communications with DOGE about SSA operations. Chief of staff Tiffany Flick also retired, after having "witnessed a disregard for critical processes", and accusing DOGE member Michael Russo of supporting DOGE's incorrect claims about dead people receiving benefits. SSA's systems contain: records of lifetime wages and earnings, social security and bank account numbers, the type and amount of benefits individuals received, citizenship status, disability and medical information.

=== Purging diversity, equity, and inclusion (DEI) ===
In December 2024, Musk tweeted: "DEI must DIE". An internal DOGE report obtained by the Washington Post on February 15, 2025, outlined a three phase process by which it would lead a DEI purge within the federal government:

- In phase one, on his first day, Trump would rescind all DEI-related executive orders and initiatives, dissolve offices at federal organizations with a DEI role and terminate their employees, ask federal websites to remove all DEI material and terminate all DEI contracts.
- In phase two, from January 21 to February 19, the government would purge employees without any DEI role but who had been "corrupted" by it. For instance, DOGE has been searching NOAA databases to find employees associated with DEI initiatives.
- In phase three, from February 20 to July 19, DOGE would commit mass-scale firings of any employee in any part of the government who did not take part in any DEI initiative, but was nonetheless determined through unknown criteria to be "DEI-related".

Records show that those who were workshopping the plan include: Stephanie Holmes, former Jones Day lawyer specialized in anti-DEI corporate work; Anthony Armstrong, who helped Musk acquire Twitter; Brian Bjelde, longtime SpaceX employee; Noah Peters, involved in Project 2025; and Adam Ramada, a venture capitalist turned DOGE Team lead.

=== Promoting its mission ===
At an Oval Office press conference on February 11, 2025, Musk pledged to make DOGE's actions "maximally transparent" and to publish them on a government website. Doge.gov went live the next day: the main page showed DOGE's tweets, a "follow on X" ad, and a few tabs; waste.gov was made private after DOGE got caught using a blog theme with the word "diverse", a Trump policy violation. Days later, hackers posted mocking messages on Doge.gov. A National Reconnaissance Office spokesperson stated that, while not being classified, the information headcount and wage data of its staff, posted on doge.gov, was not intended for public release. DOGE promised "receipts" by Valentine's Day; they appeared on February 17, as search results from the FPDS showing contract terminations. At the end of February, doge.gov did not "provide names and contact information for the officials and employees associated with its work, an organizational chart or a calendar of past and upcoming activity", according to Bloomberg News.

DOGE has extended its public relations beyond contract updates. After its first official action, DOGE's X account showed proof that it took down the Chief Diversity Officers Executive Council website, and added: "Progress"; Musk quoted the tweet and said: "It begins". Musk and DOGE promoted multiple conspiracy theories about fraud and federal employees, such as baseless claims that Democrats were giving money to illegal immigrants or that many federal employees did not exist. It has been boosting anti-DEI policies, and at times acted as message carrier. DOGE member Antonio Gracias appeared on Fox & Friends, a podcast hosted by David Sacks, and at a town hall rally held by Musk in Wisconsin to claim that undocumented immigrants were abusing Social Security and committing voter fraud. According to the Institute on Taxation and Economic Policy, undocumented immigrants contribute more than $25 billion annually to Social Security, which they are ineligible to receive benefits from. The DOGE account has retweeted and commented on similar accusations. DOGE leaders Steve Davis, Joe Gebbia, Aram Moghaddassi, Brad Smith, Anthony Armstrong, Tom Krause, and Tyler Hassen appeared on Fox News alongside Musk to defend DOGE's mission.

U.S. Doge Service v. Citizens for Responsibility and Ethics in Washington
- Court: District Court for the District of Columbia
- Started: February 20, 2025
- Docket nos.: 1:25-cv-00511 (D.D.C.); 25-5130 (D.C. Cir.); 24A1122 (SCOTUS)

Case history
- Appealed to: United States Court of Appeals for the District of Columbia Circuit
- Subsequent action: District court ruling stayed by Supreme Court via shadow docket

Court membership
- Judge sitting: Christopher R. Cooper

At the Qatar Economic Forum on May 21, Musk reiterated that DOGE was transparent, for it published "any action that is a function of DOGE" on its official website or social. On the same day, the Trump administration asked the Supreme Court to exempt DOGE from the Freedom of Information Act.

On the May version of its website, DOGE promoted savings on an "Agency Deregulation Leaderboard", resulting from various deregulation efforts.

=== Emulating Project 2025 ===
In the op-ed presenting the DOGE plan, Musk and Ramaswamy promised to work "closely" with the Office of Management and Budget (OMB), and described the decisions of "unelected bureaucrats" as "antidemocratic". On his first day in office, Trump restored Schedule F to speed up firing; earlier he nominated its champion, Russell Vought, to lead OMB. Vought founded the Center for Renewing America (CRA), where he drafted executive orders, regulations, memos, and served as an advisor for Project 2025. In multiple speeches, Vought swore to put career civil servants "in trauma".

Vice President JD Vance observed that DOGE matters less for saving money than for "making the bureaucracy responsive to the elected president". Vance shares a longstanding collaboration with Kevin Roberts, one of the architects of Project 2025. Ed Kilgore described Vought as the "glue" that ties Musk and Republicans, saying that "OMB can exchange intel with DOGE on potential targets in the bureaucracy, while OMB will definitely guide congressional Republicans as they put together massive budget-reconciliation and appropriations bills". Wired and The New York Times reported that Vought helped Musk find his way into the bureaucracy. Paul Winfree, Trump's director of budget policy during his first administration, characterized the relationship between Musk and Vought: "When Elon Musk says something, everybody responds to it. The government is not like that [...] You need people like Russ and, quite frankly, the people who Russ has been bringing into OMB as well, who are staffers who do know how to, in fact, push changes through government institutions." Musk mentioned using DOGE to impound funds, a tactic Vought discussed many times in his CRA papers.

Critics and proponents alike have noted parallels between the policies advocated for in Project 2025 and DOGE's stated goals and actions. Nine of the fifteen agencies DOGE first targeted had been identified by Project 2025 for elimination or downsizing; Bill Hoagland, former Republican staffer and director of the Senate Budget Committee for more than 20 years, considers that the DOGE playbook "has not been for the dollar savings, but more for the philosophical and ideological differences conservatives have with the work these agencies do". Jill Filipovic opined that "the mass firings, the power grabs, and the agency shuttering's are not just Musk's doing. They were planned and proposed well before Trump was even elected, right there for everyone to see, in Project 2025." The BBC suggests that, by unifying decision chains so that Trump controls independent agencies, DOGE allows Trump to implement the unitary executive theory advocated in Project 2025. NPR noted that "many of the actions that Musk took, that his DOGE group took were foreshadowed in Project 2025."

== Actions within the federal government ==
By the end of January, DOGE had installed officials of their choosing at the top of agencies controlling critical parts of the government: the Office of Personnel Management (OPM), the United States Digital Service (USDS), and the General Services Administration (GSA). Several leaders of these organizations resigned or were dismissed following clashes with DOGE, to be replaced by DOGE members. Access to information systems across the bureaucracy allowed DOGE to trace and sometimes cease flows of money. DOGE coordinated with the Office of Management and Budget (OMB) to dismantle the Agency for International Development (USAID). Their bigger targets remain the Treasury (USDT), the Social Security Administration (SSA), and Health and Human Services (HHS): spendings by HHS amount to 31%, by SSA to 16%, and by USDT to 15% of the federal budget—almost two thirds of all government expenses. In a lawsuit featuring DOGE's culture of secrecy, Judge Christopher R. Cooper found that it has "obtained unprecedented access to sensitive personal and classified data and payment systems across federal agencies", and that it "appears to have the power [...] to drastically reshape and even eliminate them wholesale" without congressional input. The Government Accountability Office (GAO) has been auditing DOGE since March over its data handling at various cabinet-level agencies. Professional auditors have been asked by Wired to evaluate DOGE's audit, and one of them said: "It's a heist, stealing a vast amount of government data."

=== Administration of federal databases ===
At the SSA, DOGE demanded access to databases with information about any holder of a Social Security number; Michael Russo, along with Steve Davis, pressured top officials to give Akash Bobba access to "everything, including source code". On March 28, Wired reported that DOGE was putting together a team to migrate the SSA's base code from COBOL to a more modern programming language, with the goal of achieving this in a matter of months; most experts said it should take several years to compile and test this safely. The Washington Post reported that DOGE and the Homeland Security Department had been behind the Social Security Administration's action, on April 8, of falsely listing over 6,000 living immigrants in their database of dead people, after DOGE made efforts to use information from the Social Security Administration against immigrants; two days later, guards escorted out senior SSA executive Greg Pearre, who clashed with DOGE member Scott Coulter. In response to a court decision that prevented DOGE from accessing SSA systems, Leland Dudek, an SSA top official and DOGE member, has been threatening to shut down the agency: "Really, I want to turn it off and let the courts figure out how they want to run a federal agency".

At HHS, DOGE member Luke Farritor was made administrator of grants.gov on March 29; one week later grant posting permissions were removed from federal officials, who were instructed to send grant notices to a DOGE-managed email address. National Institutes of Health (NIH) employees have been told that DOGE will review and approve Notice of Funding Opportunities (NOFO). The principal deputy assistant secretary for operations declared in a February 13 sworn statement that DOGE employees grafted to the agency have full access to all unclassified agency records and are tasked, among other things, with the obligation to destroy or erase copied HHS data or information when no longer needed for official purposes.

At the Department of Interior (DOI), Wired has reported that DOGE members Tyler Hassen, Stephanie Holmes, and Katrine Trampe have been seeking unfettered access to DOI's payroll, human resources, and credentialing systems, like the Federal Personnel and Payroll System (FPPS); they also sought permission to create, pause, and delete email accounts. The chief information and information security officers and the associate solicitor at the DOI were placed on leave on March 28, and told they were being investigated for workplace behavior.

At the Customs and Border Protection (CBP), DOGE registered trumpcard.gov, and a Trump card visa has appeared on immigration forms; Wired reported that DOGE members Marko Elez and Edward Coristine worked on the project.

In August 2025, a whistleblower filed a complaint that DOGE uploaded a database of Americans' sensitive Social Security information to an unsecured server, compromising the data of millions of people. The report was filed by the chief data officer of the SSA, identifying information, such as actual Social Security numbers issued by the federal government, of over 300 million Americans and accusing CIO Aram Moghaddassi of violating agency policies.

On January 16, 2026, the agency confessed in a notice of corrections that DOGE staffers had access to sensitive information that was previously denied. The information was traded amongst DOGE staffers and transferred to a non-Social Security server, which is now inaccessible to the agency. Furthermore, these transfers occurred while a federal court order barred DOGE from any data access.

=== Data collection ===
Social Security Administration v. American Federation of State, County, and Municipal Employees
- Court: District of Maryland
- Started: February 21, 2025
- Docket nos.: 1:25-cv-00596 (D. Md.); 25-1411 (4th Cir.); 24A1063 (SCOTUS)

Case history
- Appealed to: Fourth Circuit
- Subsequent action: district ruling stayed by supreme court via shadow docket

Court membership
- Judge sitting: Ellen Lipton Hollander

According to Wired, DOGE shifted focus by April 2025, to data collection and the exfiltration of sensitive information from government agencies to private databases. Whistleblowers alleged an attempt to build a "master database" on American citizens. Democrats raised concerns over potential cybersecurity and privacy law violations. The Privacy Act of 1974 has been cited in up to fourteen lawsuits pertaining to DOGE access to data that could contain sensitive personal data. Several of these lawsuits sought restraining orders and some were temporarily successful. Democratic congressional representative Gerry Connolly stated "I am concerned that DOGE is moving personal information across agencies without the notification required under the Privacy Act or related laws, such that the American people are wholly unaware their data is being manipulated in this way." On March 18, due to the lawsuits, Rep. Lori Trahan announced an effort to modernize and update the Privacy Act to address growing concerns about government surveillance, unvetted access, and misuse. The Trump administration has asked the Supreme Court to grant DOGE access to social security data. On June 6, the Supreme Court ruled DOGE access to sensitive data such as Social Security data was legal.

At the National Labor Relations Board (NLRB), a whistleblower, Daniel Berulis, revealed in April 2025 that the security to prevent access from unauthorized mobile device systems has been momentarily disabled. Temporary superusers transferred NRLB data (including lawyers contact information) and erased their trace afterwards. During extraction, they left the system exposed to public entry. Berulis noticed that DOGE member Jordan Wick was publicly working on a backdoor software days before entering NLRB; earlier Wick posted to his code repository several tools seemingly related to his DOGE work.

At the Department of Homeland Security, sources told Wired that DOGE is building a master database that connects SSA data, IRS data, biometric data, and voting records; DOGE members Edward Coristine, Kyle Schutt, Aram Moghaddassi, and Payton Rehling have been granted access to United States Immigration and Naturalization Service data, which contain information on refugees, asylum seekers, naturalized citizens, and Deferred Action for Childhood Arrivals recipients.

On June 25, a district judge ruled that a DOGE's access to the OPM database was unjustified and illegal. The Washington Post reported that DOGE has access to more than seven agency databases containing sensitive trade and contractual information. The scope of DOGE access has raised serious conflict‑of‑interest and security concerns about the potential sharing of government information with Musk's companies.

=== Russian login attempts tied to DOGE ===
Login attempts from an IP address in Russia were made minutes after DOGE gained control of the systems, using the username and password of an account created by DOGE. After Berulis and his team requested help to investigate the breach, he was sent an envelope with a threatening letter and pictures taken by drone of him walking his dog.

=== Artificial intelligence (AI) deployment ===
On February 3, Thomas Shedd announced in an all-hands meeting that GSA would operate "like a startup software company", switching to an "AI-first strategy" including writing software with "AI coding agents". Shedd floated plans to use AI to analyze government contracts, deploy vibe coding agents to federal workers, and turn GSA into a model AI agency. In the same week, the Washington Post reported that DOGE has deployed AI at the Department of Education (ED) to probe for DEI programs and employee spendings; DOGE members at ED include Brooks Morgan, Alexandra Beynon, and Adam Ramada.

On March 7, DOGE deployed its proprietary AI chatbot, intended to help workers with daily tasks, to 1,500 workers at GSA. On March 19, GSA acting administrator and DOGE member Stephen Ehikian showed a demo of the AI to employees. In April, Christopher Sweet was tasked with rewriting the Department of Housing and Urban Development's (HUD) rules and regulations using AI; employees were told that the AI model crawls through the Code of Federal Regulations (eCFR), and is refined by the agency to be deployed through the government.

EPA employee communications were monitored by AI for DEI terminology, anti-Trump, or anti-Musk sentiment.

On May 22, Wired reported that it viewed materials showing that DOGE members within the OPM reviewed and classified "Fork in the Road" responses using AI.

Wired reported that employees at the Department of Veterans Affairs (VA) observed attempts by Sahil Lavingia to use the AI tool OpenHands to write code for the department's systems. A ProPublica investigation published June 6, 2025, found that Sahil Lavingia had written, with the assistance of AI, code for an outdated AI model that identified more than 2,000 contracts at the VA as nonessential. According to ProPublica, the AI hallucinated some flagged contracts to be worth orders of magnitude more than they were. Experts consulted by ProPublica, as well as Lavingia, said the code was flawed. At the time of the investigation, at least two dozen of the flagged contracts had been canceled. Lavingia also said that another DOGE employee was involved in making the AI more "aggressive" in terminating contracts; VA stood behind its AI cutting program.

According to digital governance researcher Nai Lee Kalema, AI enables DOGE's streamlining of federal government, and accelerates algorithmic governance.

On July 1, Politico reported that Thomas Shedd was leading AI.gov, a project to accelerate the deployment of AI in the federal government.

On July 26, the Washington Post published the presentation of a "DOGE AI Deregulation Decision Tool" dedicated to eliminate regulations no longer required by law; the tool has been reportedly "vetted and endorsed" by James Burnham, Austin Raynor, Jacob Altik and Ashley Boizelle.

In August, Wired reported that DOGE associates at HUD, led by Christopher Sweet, were developing a tool called SweetREX Deregulation AI designed to quicken the process of reviewing and revising regulation. SweetREX can identify regulations that are not required by statute, draft altered regulations, and sort public comments on proposed changes to federal regulations. Sweet said that the tool was primarily built around Google's Gemini LLM.

The Office of Management and Budget (OMB) has tasked former DOGE employee Scott Langmack with creating custom AI applications to "accelerate the elimination of the excess regulation constraining American business."

=== Downsizing of the federal workforce ===
About 300,000 United States federal civil service layoffs have been announced by the second Trump administration, almost all of them attributed to the Department of Government Efficiency. On August 26, 2025, the Partnership for Public Service said just under 200,000 federal workers had already left their jobs. As of July 14, 2025, CNN has tracked at least 51,224 workers laid off or targeted for layoffs. As of May 12, 2025, The New York Times tracked more than 58,500 confirmed cuts, more than 76,000 employee buyouts, and more than 149,000 other planned reductions; cuts total 12% of the 2.4 million civilian federal workers. By March 2026, 9% of the federal workforce has been eliminated.

Comparison of changes in federal civilian employment starting from the December before each president began his term. Data through June 2025.

==== Hiring freeze and firing ====
Trump issued a memorandum titled Hiring Freeze on his first day in office. The memo asks the OMB director to submit a plan to reduce the size of the federal workforce, in consultation with the director of OPM and "the Administrator of the United States DOGE Service". The next day, Charles Ezell, the acting administrator of OPM, ordered federal agencies to close their DEI programs by 5 PM EST the following day. Scott Kupor was nominated to fill Ezell's role on a permanent basis. Ezell asked employees to report those who would hide programs "by using coded or imprecise language". On January 27, a memo was sent instructing OPM employees to work on-site full-time. Investigative journalist Molly White found that metadata on some of these memos indicated that they were ghostwritten by Noah Peters and Thomas Shenk, both with Project 2025 ties; Peters is also a DOGE member.

Ezell sent a memo to federal agencies on the first day of Trump's second term reminding them that they can bypass the Merit System Protection Board rights when terminating new hires. He then gave them the work week to send Amanda Scales a list of all probationary employees. On February 13, 2025, OPM advised agencies to terminate most of an estimated 200,000 probationary workers. Following the guidance, layoffs cascaded across HHS, the Federal Aviation Administration, and the National Nuclear Security Administration.

==== "Fork in the road" and "Five things" emails ====
DOGE used OPM systems to create the hr@opm.gov address and email all federal employees. On January 28, OPM introduced the deferred resignation program, in which federal employees who resigned by February 6 would receive salary and benefits until September 30. The program was introduced in an email with the same subject line, "Fork in the road" which Musk used shortly after taking over Twitter. By the deadline, roughly 75,000 employees had taken the offer. A PDF version of the offer added that workers who accept the buyout offer need to waive their right to legal action.

On February 22, Musk posted on X ordering federal workers to summarize their weekly accomplishments, warning that noncompliance would be seen as resignation. Shortly after, OPM emailed employees requesting five bullet point summaries, reportedly without notifying Cabinet officials and agency leaders in advance. The Department of Defense ordered staff and the United States Armed Forces to ignore Musk's request; the FBI and State Department told their employees not to respond; NASA employees were advised to delay their response; HHS explicitly warned employees not to participate in the email request, due to the fact that replies might be "read by malign foreign actors." Two days later, OPM stated that responding to the initial email was voluntary; however, Musk tweeted that if employees still refused to respond, it would "result in termination".

A second "Fork in the road" buyout offer has been sent to Peace Corps employees.

==== Mass layoffs ====
On January 31, Brian Bjelde, senior advisor and DOGE member, told career supervisors that the target was to cut 70% of OPM workforce. GSA acting administrator and DOGE member Stephen Ehikian warned two weeks later that he would apply Reduction In Force (RIF) measures to the agency. On March 7, DOGE deployed its proprietary AI chatbot, intended to help workers with daily tasks, to 1,500 workers at GSA. The deployment came after Thomas Shedd fired around 90 technologists and announced that the GSA branch he supervises would shrink by 50 percent. Among them was the 18F team, which Shedd deemed "non-essential".

Riccardo Biasini has modified autorif in OPM's code repository, a program (as the name suggests) intended to automate the Reduction in Force (RIF) process.

=== Coordination to shut down operations ===
On February 1, members of DOGE gained access to some of USAID's classified information. Two security chiefs at USAID attempted to deny DOGE members access to the classified material because they did not meet the requirements to access it; however, the security chiefs were then placed on leave. On February 24, the Washington Post reported that Luke Farritor and Gavin Kliger manually blocked multiple times payments for life critical programs that Secretary of State Marco Rubio had approved by decree. On March 18, Jeremy Lewin was appointed as a deputy administrator in USAID; Lewin wrote a memo on March 28 to discontinue USAID's mission, after a judge explicitly ordered that he and DOGE should be barred from making further cuts at the agency.

On February 6, CFPB staff were told by email that DOGE members (including Nikhil Rajpal, Gavin Kliger, and Chris Young) entered the agency building and would require access to CFPB data, systems, and equipment. The next evening, Russ Vought became acting head of the bureau. He ordered all work be stopped and the Washington DC office to be closed. A mass firing in mid April attempted to reduce the bureau's headcount by approximately 86%, but it has been halted in court. Kliger conducted the mass layoffs, which included the ethics lawyers who warned him against holding $715,000 from companies in conflict with CFPB.

DOGE entered the Department of Education in early February and accessed internal databases with student information. Its team used AI to investigate the department's sensitive financial data. It then announced that $900 million worth of contracts were cut. These contracts were mostly from the Institute of Education Sciences which is responsible for researching education outcomes in public schools. According to anonymous sources in the education department, DOGE members pushed high ranking Department of Education officials out of their own offices and set up white noise machines to muffle their conversations. DOGE's demands were seen as arbitrary such as cutting 80% of the funding for the web infrastructure supporting student loan applications. On February 12, mass firings began; Linda McMahon, wrestling mogul turned secretary of education, said she would like the Department of Education "to be closed immediately" because it "is a big con job". By March 11, almost half of the Department of Education workforce had been fired.

The United States Institute of Peace (USIP) is a nonprofit created by congress. Trump fired most of USIP's governing board on March 14, and the remaining three members of the board fired George Moose. On March 17, Inter-Con Security allowed DOGE to enter the USIP with their police escort. Inter-Con vice president Derrick Hanna informed USIP that DOGE had contacted them and "threatened all of their federal contracts if they did not permit entry for DOGE". USIP filed a lawsuit against DOGE, claiming that they "have plundered the offices in an effort to access and gain control of the Institute's infrastructure, including sensitive computer systems"; the filing showed photos of financial documents placed in a bin labeled "shred", and an USIP logo ripped down from the wall. Court documents filed on March 31 revealed that Nate Cavanaugh, a DOGE member who acts as the Institute of Peace (USIP) surrogate president, was instructed to transfer USIP's assets—including its real estate—to the GSA. In a letter to Stephen Ehikian of the GSA, Cavanaugh sought an exemption from having to reimburse the value of the building, estimated at $500 million, which would entail the GSA receiving the building for free.

=== Executive branch shakeup ===
On February 26, Trump issued an executive order that includes the immediate disposal of surplus federal property and reduce non-essential travel; the first agencies to be targeted were international organizations and educational institutions. Two days later, DOGE put a $1 spending limit on the SmartPay cards of GSA, OPM, CFPB, and USAID employees. Shortly after the limit was extended to 24,000 cards across 14 agencies, and one week later 146,000 cards across 16 agencies were frozen. Weeks before Trump's executive order, employees from various agencies complained about loss of Wi-Fi, lack of furniture, room, and bathroom products.

==== Real assets selloff ====
On March 4, the GSA published a list of 443 properties to be sold, including headquarters, courthouses, and 47 SSA offices. That list was edited the same day to remove about 120 properties and then taken off the GSA website the next day. The public list included a previously undisclosed "highly sensitive federal complex in Springfield, Virginia" where the CIA conducts clandestine operations.

==== Recontracting ====
At the Department of the Treasury (USDT), DOGE member Sam Corcos will lead the creation of an Application Programming Interface (API) for IRS data, using Foundry, a platform developed by Palantir. Earlier, Wired revealed that two DOGE members, Corcos and Gavin Kliger, were planning to run a hackathon with the goal of creating an API to interconnect all IRS databases.

In March, DOGE installed a Starlink user terminal at the White House complex, raising conflict of interest concerns due to Starlink being a subsidiary of Musk-owned SpaceX. In response the White House said that the terminal was donated by Starlink and approved by legal counsel and the United States Secret Service. GSA subscribed to Starlink for its Washington offices in mid-February. In the same week, Musk confirmed that SpaceX had a lease agreement with the Federal Aviation Administration (FAA).

==== Outsourcing ====
On April 17, ProPublica reported multiple meetings between GSA and Ramp to outsource the SmartPay credit card program; Ramp's backers include Peter Thiel and Jared Kushner. Ramp has confirmed to TechCrunch it was participating in a Request for information process.

Facing difficulties processing federal retirement applications and reductions in force while laying off personnel, OPM has awarded a one-year contract to Workday, Inc. in May 2025.

==== Privatization ====
During a Morgan Stanley conference, Musk said that "we should privatize anything that can reasonably be privatized", naming USPS and Amtrak as examples.

During a private meeting, DOGE member Leland Dudek proposed to outsource Social Security customer service. Experts have warned that the SSA is on a path of privatization.

==== Deregulation ====
On June 27, Bureau of Alcohol, Tobacco, Firearms and Explosives (ATF) staffers told the Washington Post that a DOGE team was dispatched to the agency with the goal of revising or eliminating 47 regulations by July 4. The Washington Post revealed a July 1 internal presentation outlining an "AI Deregulation Decision Tool" to analyze more than 200,000 federal regulations, with the objective of eliminating half of them by January 2026.

=== Savings announcements ===
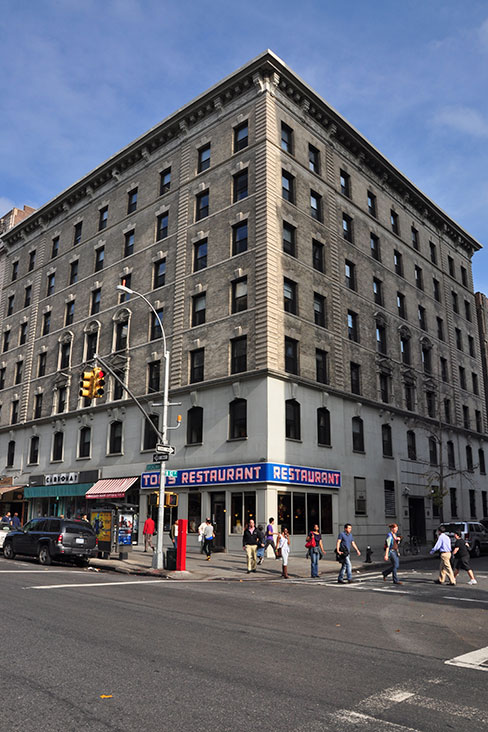
Columbia University's Armstrong Hall, where GISS was located; Tom's Restaurant below.

DOGE announced contracts, grants and leases termination on its website. Federal government contracts are often awarded as cost-plus contracts where the total price will be determined at a later date. To estimate its savings, DOGE uses the total potential value of these contracts, which federal contracting experts say is an unrealistic overestimate of planned spending. Former Republican budget experts said the cuts were driven by political ideology more than frugality. Announcements include:

- A $168,707 contract for an exhibit on Anthony Fauci at the National Institutes of Health's (NIH) Museum. This contract has already been paid in full.
- Three $15 million contracts by the United States Environmental Protection Agency (EPA) totaling $45 million.
- An $8 million contract between the Immigration and Customs Enforcement and D&G Support Services, LLC for "Equal Employment Opportunity". DOGE originally and falsely claimed this contract saved $8 billion, which was subsequently corrected down to $8 million.
- A lease for the "Allowance to Former Presidents Office" for the Carter Center. DOGE announced the lease's annual cost was $128,233 and by terminating it, they saved $544,991, yet benefits under the Former Presidents Act expired upon Carter's death in December 2024.
- On April 4, DOGE claimed having saved c. $1M by replacing magnetic tapes with digital backups, despite the risks of doing so. Experts noted that no cost and benefit analysis was presented to justify the savings estimate, and that tape remains the cheapest medium to save data.
- A lease for the Risk Management Agency (RMA), a branch of the United States Department of Agriculture (USDA), located in Topeka, Kansas. DOGE announced the lease's annual cost was $121,818 and by terminating it, they saved $964,396.
- A $22 million contract for "research and development in the physical, engineering, and life sciences" for the NOAA Office of Oceanic and Atmospheric Research (OAR). On January 30, 2025, NOAA, at the recommendation of DOGE, modified the contract to "add funding" and "add to increase travel funding" by 4%. On February 6, 2025, the contract was again modified at DOGE's recommendation, to "partially terminate" the contract, with the contract's conclusion date being changed from May 31, 2026, to May 31, 2025. According to HigherGov, this contract was actually an extension of a previous contract for the NOAA Climate Program Office, indicating DOGE added funding to the NOAA Climate Program Office.
- A $405,986 contract by the United States Department of Homeland Security (DHS) for "resilience, energy, and sustainability management program support services".

Many terminated contracts have not been disclosed by DOGE. After two weeks, hundreds of claimed savings have been scrubbed from its "wall", including large items; Martha Gimbel, director of The Budget Lab at Yale, doubted the wall's reliability. On March 13, journalists discovered that DOGE removed federal identification numbers from the publicly available source code, making their receipts hard to verify; a White House official invoked security to justify DOGE's opacity. On March 26, DOGE has removed USAID contract details due to "legal reason"; about 45% of the items disappeared from their website, according to CBS News. By May 13, DOGE removed 31 contracts from its Savings tracker one week after the New York Times reported that 43 of the contracts they audited have been restored.

DOGE's initial reported savings was inaccurate due to counting contracts multiple times, listing contracts that have already been paid as savings, and misrepresenting potential savings based on contract limits rather than actual spending. About a third of the 2,300 contract terminations released on February 24 would not save the government any money. Richard Revesz noted that DOGE's "Agency Deregulation Leaderboard" savings ignored the additional costs deregulating health care, finance and energy would put on citizens, especially low income people.

DOGE reported approximately $660 million in savings from lease cancellations and non-renewals nationwide as of March 2025. Researchers estimate that lease cancellations in Washington, D.C. alone generated office property value losses of $575 million. Compared to the $76 million in savings for D.C. reported on the DOGE website as of mid-March 2025, the cancellations fail a simple cost-benefit analysis.

According to an August 2025 analysis of $32.7B in contract savings it could verify, Politico estimated DOGE saved $1.4B, less than 5% of its claimed savings. In a January 2026 deposition, DOGE staffer Nate Cavanaugh, who had led the US Institute for Peace and co-led the National Endowment for the Humanities, admitted that DOGE had not reduced the federal deficit; the Hamilton Project tracker indicated that in 2025 government spending went from $7.1T to $7.558T.

=== Government Accountability Office audit 2026 ===
The Government Accountability Office (GAO) examined $110 billion of savings on contracts, grants, and leases between January 20, 2025, and July 7, 2026, published on DOGE's "Wall of receipts" website. The GAO found that the website provided insufficient information for verification of its claims. More than half of the listed contracts were either not terminated or their status could not be determined because DOGE had not provided sufficient details; additionally, the basis for some claims, such as savings of $1.7 billion on a Defense Department contract that was not terminated, was unknown. DOGE did not provide sufficient details to allow the GAO to verify DOGE's methodologies for calculating the savings from terminated contracts and 96% of grant savings. It claimed credit for identifying 264 leases for termination, including 108 that were already being phased out when DOGE took over, overstating the savings by $80 million.

== Actions outside of the federal government ==
On April 11, 2025, DOGE contacted the independently funded Vera Institute of Justice to discuss placing a DOGE team inside the organization; DOGE was subsequently informed that Vera no longer received federal funding after the earlier termination of their federal contracts by the Department of Justice.

On April 17, DOGE members met with leaders of the National Gallery of Art (NGA) to discuss its tax exemption status.

Evidence from an April court case showed that DOGE member and former Tesla employee Tarak Makecha sent the Justice Department directives to terminate contracts with the Acacia Center for Justice.

On April 29, DOGE member Nate Cavanaugh contacted two members from the Corporation for Public Broadcasting (CPB) board to embed a DOGE team; CPB is a non-profit corporation independent from the federal government.

In January 2026, the SSA declared that a DOGE affiliate signed a 'Voter Data Agreement' as an SSA employee with an advocacy group that sought to analyze state voter rolls; the agreement was executed in March 2025. Correcting previous declarations under oath, SSA also revealed that Steve Davis received by email a file with the private information of about 1,000 people.

== Response ==
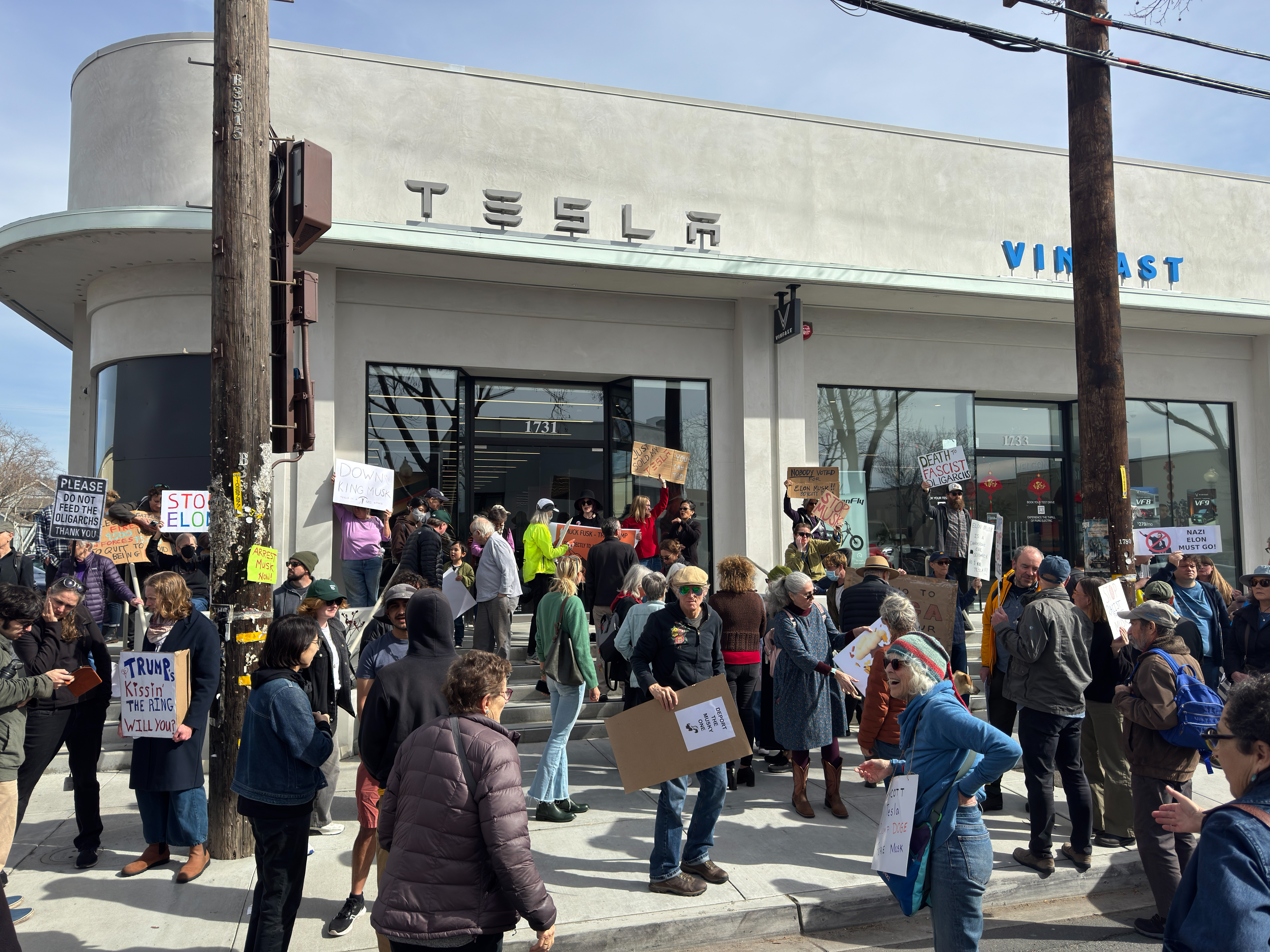
Anti-Musk protest at the Berkeley, California, Tesla showroom, February 2025

The actions of the DOGE have attracted reactions from officials, scholars, and citizens. While a majority supports the creation of an agency dedicated to efficiency efforts, most opinion polls show opposition to DOGE and Elon Musk, as of March 2025. Representatives created task forces to support DOGE efforts to cut waste. Countrywide protests have been organized to oppose mass layoffs, service cuts, privatization, and data extraction; United States Digital Service employees have resigned in protest. Various groups have sued DOGE, Musk, and the Trump administration.

Supporters have emphasized the need for efficiency and fiscal responsibility; they have expressed hope that DOGE will cut down on wasteful spending. Unitary executive theory advocates argue that the bureaucracy forms a "fourth branch of government" that should be bent to the president's will. Critics have spoken of a corporate coup of the US government by an entity they deem unaccountable and unconstitutional. Security experts have pointed to national security and cybersecurity risks created by DOGE teams rushing into critical infrastructure. Potential conflicts of interest have been raised about Musk and his associates: with government contracts that clash with federal regulators, which DOGE is trying to slash. The administration suggested that Musk would recuse himself if his interests conflicted. DOGE has been accused of pursuing a symbolic culture war rather than targeting wasteful spendings. Multi-billion-dollar mistakes have been reported in savings DOGE claimed.

== Lawsuits ==
As of April 2025, the Trump administration was the subject of more than 200 lawsuits, many of them involving DOGE. There are multiple lawsuits concerning the downsizing of federal organizations such as USAID, and privacy and security concerns related to the accessing of computer systems and records across the government. Multiple court cases found that DOGE's actions were illegal and were rebuked by federal judges who ordered that several actions be reversed or halted. Several judges issued temporary restraining orders preventing DOGE from accessing personal information from the Department of Education, Office of Personnel Management, and Treasury Department, stating they violated the Privacy Act of 1974. Others ordered that it must honor Freedom of Information Act requests, and delete data it collected from Social Security. Judge Theodore Chuang found its dismantling of USAID "likely violated the United States Constitution in multiple ways". In mid-2025, DOGE was granted access to Treasury payment system information, and the Supreme Court later exempted it from disclosure and granted it access to Social Security records in two subsequent rulings on the shadow docket along ideological lines.

Judges and journalists have struggled to define DOGE; members of the Trump administration have given conflicting accounts of its authority and leadership. Trump has tried to exempt DOGE from disclosing its internal documentation. In court, DOGE has argued that it is not a government agency; a federal judge found that DOGE is indeed one.

John Yoo has suggested that presenting Musk as a presidential advisor may provide him "legal insulation" over DOGE actions. Josh Blackman concurred: "So long as an actual government official is pushing the 'cancel' button, I don't know that Musk is holding any actual substantial authority." Judge Theodore D. Chuang still declared that Musk has "played a leading role" in actions taken by DOGE at USAID, by tweeting on February 2 and 3 about events for which there is a trace in the proper chain of command days later.

== Institutionalization ==
After the Trump–Musk feud in June, OMB director Russell Vought told lawmakers that DOGE affiliates have become "institutionalized" and that he envisioned them "as in-house consultants as a part of the agency's leadership". Legacy employees told Wired they were asked not to call them "DOGE". At the same time, DOGE has continued to recruit tech workers, promising up to $195,000. According to Sahil Lavingia and other sources, Davis was still involved after he officially left, through Signal.

DOGE affiliates started to integrate other agencies, not as members of a separate organization embedded to them. Edward Coristine has disappeared from GSA's directory and joined the SSA, alongside Aram Moghaddassi; Joe Gebbia has been appointed as the first chief design officer of the National Design Studio; Jeremy Lewin joined the Department of State; Zachary Terrell has become HHS chief information officer; Rachel Riley became the acting Office of Naval Research chief. Sam Beyda became CDC's chief of staff in late 2025. Amy Gleason was already an adviser to Robert F. Kennedy Jr. in March.

In November 2025, Scott Kupor told Reuters that DOGE had ceased to exist and that the government-wide hiring freeze was over. He later clarified that DOGE was no longer the "centralized entity", but that OPM and OMB would "institutionalize" its changes and keep its principles alive. According to a White House contingency plan, there were 45 DOGE officials in October. In January 2026, Bloomberg has found that 55 individuals responsible for workforce cuts did not receive salary compensation, like many early DOGE hires; this list also includes political appointees, such as Linda McMahon and Lee Zeldin. In April, a USDS official said the agency had 90 employees and planned to grow.

In July 2026, the Washington Post reported that two dozen staff vetted by DOGE remain staffed throughout the federal government, with many working at the National Design Studio.

== Impact ==
=== Revenue loss ===
The Senate subcommittee on investigations reported that DOGE has generated over $21.7 billion in waste across the federal government. Treasury Department and IRS officials predicted a decrease of more than ten percent in tax receipts by the April 15 deadline in 2025—more than $500 billion in lost federal revenue; they noted that "DOGE-driven workforce reductions" were a factor. However, actual revenue for 2025 increased from $5.100 trillion to $5.313 trillion.

The Partnership for Public Service estimated in April 2025 that the DOGE effort will cost taxpayers over $135 billion in 2025 due to productivity losses, paid leave, and the costs of dismissing and re-hiring employees. This estimate did not include the costs of lawsuits or lower tax collections by the IRS.

=== Effect on the economy ===
Government organization and management experts noted that the DOGE effort "appears to go beyond IT and HR initiatives to include areas such as procurement, real property, and substantive agency operations". Some experts warn that the actions could negatively impact the economy and markets.

=== Hit to affordable housing ===
DOGE canceled at least $100 million worth of affordable housing contracts to nonprofits in February 2025 after trawling their websites for diversity, equity, and inclusion (DEI) terminology. According to Democrat Shaun Donovan, former secretary of HUD, that "decision will raise costs for families, hobble the creation of affordable homes, forfeit local jobs, and sap opportunity from thousands of communities in all 50 states."

=== Personal data breach risk ===
The inspector general of the Federal Reserve released a report on November 3, 2025, stating that the cuts at the Consumer Financial Protection Bureau (CFPB) made the CFPB's personal data security program ineffective.

After DOGE exposed sensitive information of a USIP program and falsely accused an Afghan scholar of working for the Taliban (online, in the May Jesse Watters interview, and in courts), Taliban intelligence officials detained, beat, and questioned three relatives of the scholar, whose family had to flee Kabul.

=== Website crashes ===
On March 25, services at the Social Security Administration (SSA) were reportedly breaking down; there were multiple website crashes, call waiting times were two times longer than previous years, there was a 24% call answer rate. On April 7, Gizmodo reported that SSA servers crashed after DOGE members updated their verification software without testing if it could handle load surges. On June 20, the Washington Post reported that SSA has stopped disclosing benefits process time, call wait time, callback wait time, number of callers waiting on hold, and number of callers waiting on callback.

=== Human death toll ===
As of February 5, 2026, the Trump administration's pause and termination of foreign aid programs—conducted with the assistance of DOGE—has led to an estimated 793,900 deaths, mostly children, according to public health professor Brooke Nichols's Impact Counter. A Lancet study projected an additional 14 million all-age deaths by 2030, including more than four million children younger than five years old.

== See also ==
- Expenditures in the United States federal budget
- Florida Department of Government Efficiency
- Government effectiveness index
- Political accountability
- Regulatory reform
- Rulemaking
- United States federal budget
- NYC Commission on Government Efficiency (COGE)

=== Related committees ===
- United States Senate Committee on Appropriations – Standing committee of the United States Senate
- United States House Committee on Appropriations – Standing committee of the United States House of Representatives
- United States House Oversight Subcommittee on Delivering on Government Efficiency

=== Similar entities ===
Year(s)	Name
1905	Keep Commission
1910–1913	Commission on Economy and Efficiency
1916–1933	United States Bureau of Efficiency
1937	Brownlow Committee
1947–1949	Hoover Commission
1953–1955	Second Hoover Commission
1982–1984	Grace Commission
1993–1998	National Partnership for Reinventing Government
2006–2012	Project on National Security Reform
1921–present	Government Accountability Office
1964–present	Administrative Conference of the United States
