= Economy Act of 1932 =

- Long title: An Act Making appropriations for the Legislative Branch of the Government for the fiscal year ending June 30, 1933, and for other purposes.
- Enacted by: the 72nd United States Congress
- Effective: June 30, 1932

Citations
- Public law: Public Law 72-212
- Statutes at Large: 47 Stat. 382

Codification
- Acts amended: Act of May 21, 1920

Legislative history
- Introduced in the House as H.R. 11267 by D‑TX James P. Buchananth on April 11, 1932; Committee consideration by House Committee on Appropriations; Passed the House on May 3, 1932 (316–46); Passed the Senate on June 8, 1932 (Voice vote); Reported by the joint conference committee on June 1932; agreed to by the House on June 29, 1932 (Agreed to conference report) and by the Senate on June 29, 1932 (Agreed to conference report); Signed into law by President Herbert Hoover on June 30, 1932

United States Supreme Court cases
- INS v. Chadha (1933 historical context on legislative vetoes)

The Economy Act of 1932 is an Act of Congress that established the purchasing authority of the federal government. Title VI of this act authorized heads of executive departments, establishments, bureaus, and offices to place orders with any other such Federal agency unless the requisitioned goods or services could be acquired as conveniently or more cheaply from the private sector. It was signed in the final days of the Herbert Hoover administration in February 1933.

== Section 213 ==
Section 213 of the Economy Act of 1932 was controversial because it required the government to fire one member of each married couple working in government. The original bill called for the dismissal of wives over husbands, however the text of the bill was changed before finalization due to “fear, on the part of legislators, of the political effect, if discrimination against women were otherwise so clearly and forcibly shown.” The wife's salary was characterized as “pin money” by Frances Perkins, New York's Commissioner of Labor, who said, "“The woman ‘pin-money worker’ who competes with the necessity worker is a menace to society, a selfish, shortsighted creature, who ought to be ashamed of herself...Until we have every woman in this community earning a living wage...I am not willing to encourage those who are under no economic necessities to compete with their charm and education, their superior advantages, against the working girl who has only her two hands.”

The National Woman's Party engaged in a campaign to repeal the law. Section 213 was repealed on July 26, 1937.
