= Isabelle Boemeke =

Brazilian model (born 1990)

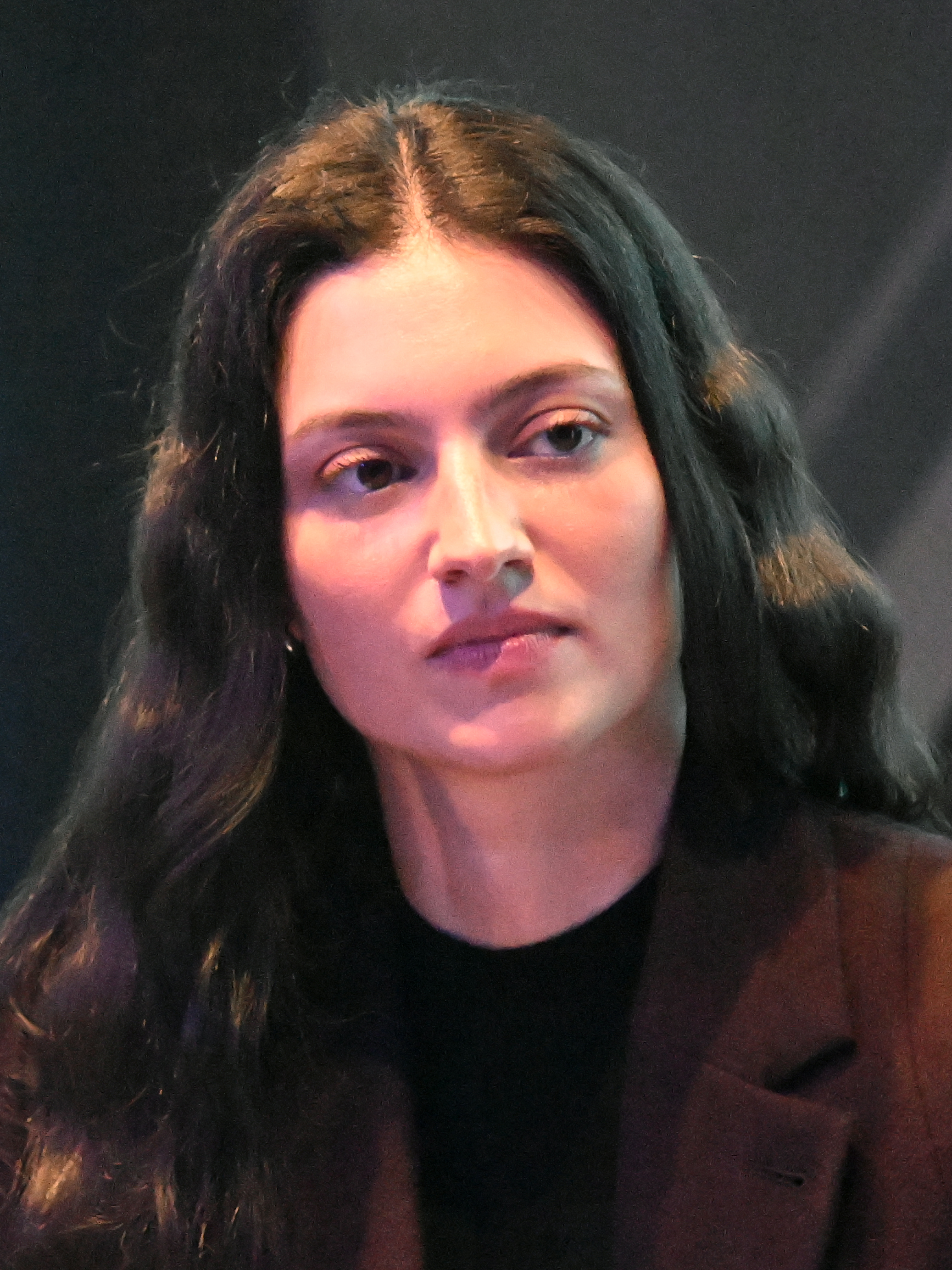
- Boemeke in 2024
- Born: 1990 (age 35–36); Brazil
- Other name: Isodope
- Occupations: Model; Social media personality; Nuclear energy activist
- Spouse: Joe Gebbia
- Children: 1
- Website: isodope.com

Isabelle Boemeke (born 1990), is a Brazilian fashion model and social media personality/influencer.

Boemeke is best known for a video posted on various social media platforms that went viral in 2020, which gained coverage due to her celebrity contacts. Her sole focus is promoting the benefits of nuclear power.

== Early life ==
Born in 1990, Boemeke was raised in a small town in Rio Grande do Sul, Brazil and attended a Catholic high school. Boemeke began working as a fashion model at the age of 17.

== Career ==
In 2016, Boemeke first learned about the benefits of nuclear generated electricity from a tweet by Carolyn Porco about molten salt thorium reactors.

The 2019 Australian bushfire and Amazon rainforest wildfires motivated Boemeke to use her platform to address what she perceived to be the root cause of such issues. She believed that despite its controversial reputation in the media, nuclear generated electricity is necessary to solve climate change.

To promote nuclear power, Boemeke created a social media account, calling herself Isodope, and began writing, producing, and editing videos that promoted facts about nuclear generated electricity. She copied social media trends to adapt them to nuclear topics, and was inspired by Lil Miquela, who she took visual cues from vaporwave and mashed the aesthetic with contemporary social media tropes.

Despite being relatively unknown outside of a few social media videos, Boemeke described meeting important people in LA who were accepted her request to give a TED talk. In 2022, Boemeke delivered a TED Talk titled, Nuclear Power is Our Best Hope to Ditch Fossil Fuels, in which she argued that when it comes to nuclear power, the world had been sold a bad meme. By August 2025, Boemeke's TED Talk had been viewed more than 1.8 million times.

Boemeke served as a co-producer of Nuclear Now by providing funding for the 2022 documentary film directed by Oliver Stone that advocates for nuclear electricity as a critical component in solving for climate related issues.

In August 2025, Boemeke published Rad Future: The Untold Story of Nuclear Electricity and How It Will Save the World. The book presents nuclear electricity, its history, and its role in addressing climate change. Coverage of the release noted that the book attracted attention from public figures, including musician Diplo, actress Gwyneth Paltrow, as well as billionaire Michael Bloomberg. The book has also been subject to controversy for its promotion of Michael Shellenberger, and has been deemed as something that "indulges in conspiracy theories, unsourced claims, and personal attacks against the industry’s critics."

== Activism ==
In December 2021, she organized a single protest against the closure of the Diablo Canyon nuclear plant in San Luis Obispo County, California, arguing that the state would struggle to reduce carbon emissions without it. Under a change of leadership, the plant closure has been delayed until 2030.

Time magazine described her as a "Next Generation Leader" in 2022.

== Personal life ==
Boemeke is married to American billionaire and co-founder of Airbnb, Joe Gebbia. Gebbia was the Trump-appointed Chief Design Officer as of November 2025, and a former DOGE official. Boemeke has expressed support for her husband’s appointment in the Trump Administration. They live in Austin, Texas, with their son.

== See also ==
- Grace Stanke
