= Nathan Blecharczyk =

American businessman (born 1983)

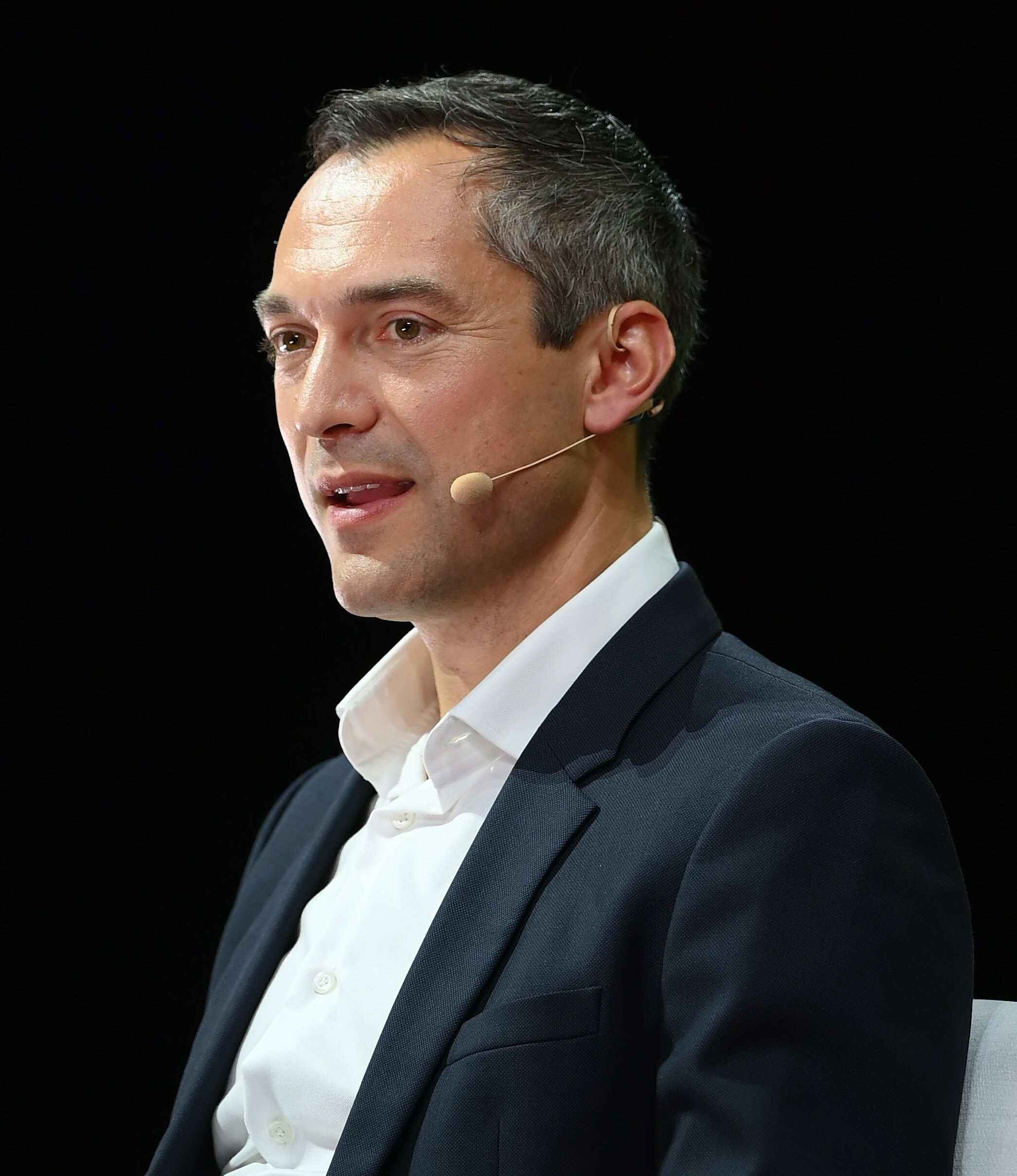
- Blecharczyk in 2022
- Born: 1983 (age 42–43)
- Education: Harvard University (BS)
- Occupation: Businessman
- Known for: Co-founder and CSO of Airbnb
- Title: CSO of Airbnb
- Spouse: Elizabeth Morey Blecharczyk
- Children: 2

Nathan Blecharczyk (/bləˈʃɑːrzɪk/; born 1983) is the co-founder and chief strategy officer (CSO) of Airbnb, and chairman of Airbnb China. Blecharczyk was also the company's first chief technology officer. Blecharczyk is the 203rd richest person in the world according to Forbes, with a net worth of $9.4 billion, mostly due to his ownership of 62 million shares of Airbnb.

== Early life and education ==
Blecharczyk was born in 1983, the son of Sheila (née Underwood) and Paul Steven Blecharczyk, who is Polish American. His ancestors came to the United States around the time of World War I. He grew up in an upper-middle-class family in Boston, Massachusetts. He attended Boston Latin Academy, graduating in 2001. During high school, he made money by creating a software business. His web-hosting business provided services to spammers and was once listed on The Spamhaus Project "Registry of Known Spam Operators (ROKSO)" which lists the top spamming services.

He continued writing programs while attending Harvard University in pursuit of a Bachelor of Science degree in computer science, and made enough money to pay his tuition before abandoning his web-hosting business to focus on his studies in 2002. He was also on the business staff of The Harvard Crimson during his time at Harvard College.

== Career ==
Blecharczyk began his career as an engineer at OPNET in 2005. He was a lead developer at Batiq in 2007. Blecharczyk moved into an apartment with Joe Gebbia after seeing an ad on Craigslist. In 2008, Blecharczyk partnered with Brian Chesky and Joe Gebbia to found Airbnb, and was the company's first chief technology officer and coded the company's original website using Ruby on Rails. Later that year, after failing to raise funding, the founders bought mass quantities of cereal, designed packaging branded as '"Obama O's" and "Cap'n McCain's" cereal to sell at the Democratic National Convention in Denver, Colorado. Originally intended as a marketing ploy, the company sold enough cereal to raise $30,000, and attracted the attention of Paul Graham, who invited the founders to the January 2009 winter training session of his startup incubator, Y Combinator, which provided them with training and $20,000 in funding in exchange for a 6% interest in the company. In the early years of the company, Airbnb overcame attempts to ban the service in New York City and San Francisco and eventually agreed to pay hotel taxes.

Blecharczyk oversaw Airbnb's 2015 expansion into Cuba.

In early 2017, Blecharczyk transitioned to chief strategy officer at Airbnb. Blecharczyk was announced as the chairman of Airbnb China, also known as Aibiying, in October 2017.

In summer 2019, after Sean M. Joyce, then a senior Airbnb official, raised concerns after Chinese government officials asked Airbnb for enhanced data sharing in China Blecharczyk responded that the company was not there to "promote American values."

== Personal life ==
Blecharczyk resides in San Francisco, California. He is married to Elizabeth Morey Blecharczyk, a neonatologist. They have two children; Blecharczyk has been a supporter of parental leave for fathers.

=== Philanthropy ===
Blecharczyk joined Warren Buffett and Bill Gates' 'The Giving Pledge', a select group of billionaires who have committed to give the majority of their wealth away.

In 2019, he donated $1 million to his alma mater, Boston Latin Academy.
