= Nuclear Now =

Documentary film by Oliver Stone

- Directed by: Oliver Stone
- Written by: Oliver Stone; Joshua S. Goldstein
- Based on: A Bright Future by Joshua S. Goldstein
- Produced by: Max Arvelaiz; Robert S. Wilson
- Music by: Vangelis
- Release date: September 9, 2022 (Venice Film Festival)
- Running time: 105 minutes
- Country: United States
- Box office: $48,064

Nuclear Now is a 2022 American documentary film, directed and co-written by Oliver Stone. The movie argues that nuclear energy is a solution needed to fight climate change because other renewable energies by themselves will not be sufficient in time for the planet to obtain carbon neutrality before climate change becomes irreversible.

The movie is based on the book A Bright Future: How Some Countries Have Solved Climate Change and the Rest Can Follow written by the US scientists Joshua S. Goldstein and Staffan A. Qvist. Goldstein co-authored the screenplay together with Oliver Stone. Producers include: Stefano Buono, Isabelle Boemeke, and Jon Kilik.

The documentary premiered out of competition at the 79th edition of the Venice Film Festival. Community theatrical screenings in the United States and Canada were made available on demand through Gathr. Stone and Goldstein later also pledged for their propositions at the 53rd World Economic Forum 2023 in Davos, Switzerland. It features one of the final film scores of Vangelis.

== Plot ==
As the narrator of the movie, Stone advocates nuclear power as a safe source of energy that can replace fossil fuels and thereby help to fight climate change. He predicts a doubling or quadrupling of the demand for electricity worldwide in the coming 30 years. In order to ensure sufficient backing with low-carbon power, Stone suggests a mass-production of nuclear power plants.

Stone argues that recycling, electric cars and consumption of environmentally friendly products are just attempts of middle class citizens to feel good but will not make a real difference for the climate. The script writers accuse the anti-nuclear movement of equating nuclear power with nuclear weapons and thus creating a primal fear against this form of energy. The writers furthermore imply that the oil and gas industry has been funding the campaigns.

== Reception ==
=== Positive ===
A review in Variety points out that two sides debating pros and cons of nuclear power have been entrenched for a long time. The reviewer recommends an open-minded look at the movie, however, and speculates that it may have an impact similar to An Inconvenient Truth. At the 2022 Venice International Film Festival, the International Council for Film, Television and Audiovisual Communication (CICT ICFT) awarded Nuclear Now with the Enrico Fulchignoni prize. The jury stated that the movie adds new and bold scientific insights to the discussion of a controversial topic. Damon Wise of Deadline reviewed the film, calling it "a hard watch", but stating that it "puts forward a lot of unexpected proposals about nuclear energy, debunking powerful myths along the way."

=== Negative ===
'Nuclear Now' faced a lot of criticism for its presentation. The Hollywood Reporter mentioned that the documentary lacked depth and it felt like a TED talk show. Similarly, the Los Angeles Times wrote that it felt like a decarbonization conference and it failed to be engaging. These critiques highlight concerns that the film's delivery was merely informative. They also feared that its stylistic choices would limit its impact on the audiences.

== See also ==
- Nuclear power debate
