= TrumpRx =

Prescription drug website operated by United States government

- Website type: Prescription drug marketplace
- Available in: English
- Owner: White House Office
- Website: trumprx.gov
- Launched: February 5, 2026

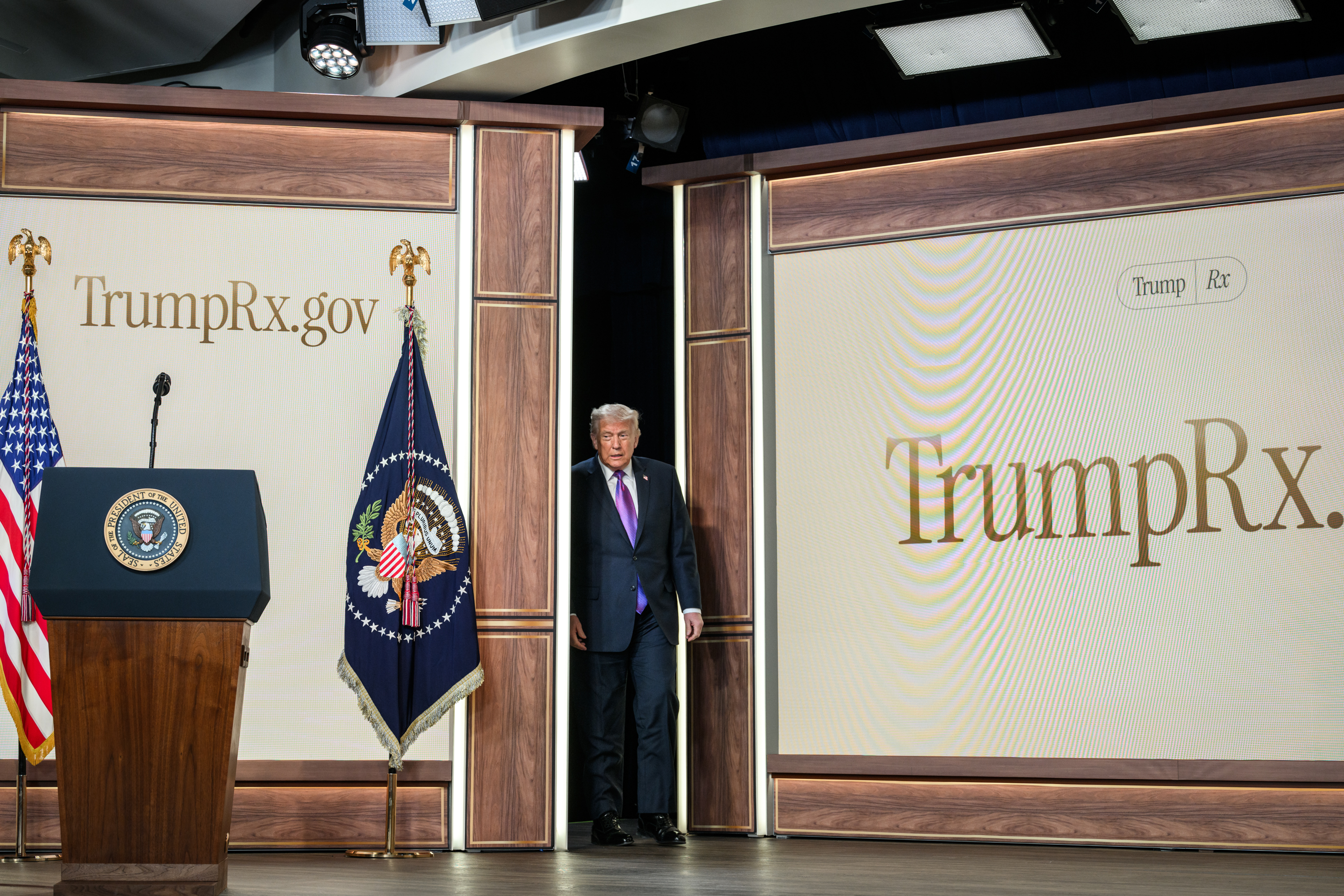
President Trump announces the launch of TrumpRX in February 2026.

TrumpRx is a prescription drug website operated by the United States federal government. It was launched in February 2026 by the second Trump administration, with the stated purpose of offering the world's lowest prices on prescription drugs to Americans.

TrumpRx does not sell prescription drugs directly to consumers, but instead allows consumers to purchase them at a discounted price directly from pharmaceutical companies. A March 2026 analysis by The New York Times found that while the website helped reduce several drug prices, it did not generally offer Americans lower drug prices than in other wealthy countries. Popular drugs on the website sold for lower prices in comparable countries; in some cases, TrumpRx prices were twice as high as in other countries.

In the following months, the website received several expansions, offering over 800 medications by June 2026.

== History ==
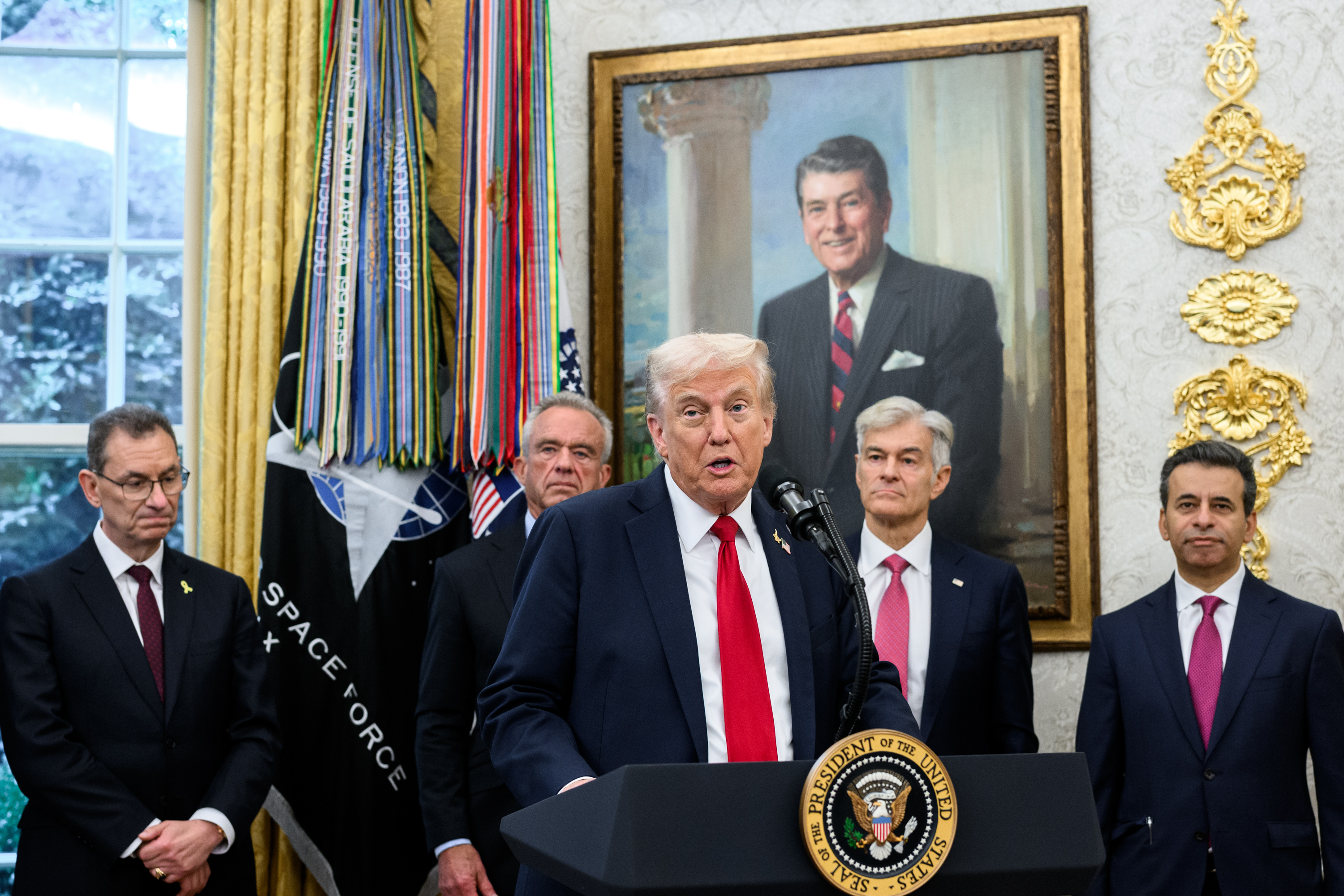
Trump announcing TrumpRx in September 2025

In September 2025, Bloomberg News reported that Trump administration officials were considering establishing a website to partially fulfill U.S. president Donald Trump's demands that drugmakers reduce their prices to levels set by other countries. On September 30, Trump announced TrumpRx from the Oval Office, joined by Pfizer chief executive Albert Bourla. The website was set to go online in January 2026.

The TrumpRx website did not launch as scheduled in January 2026. During a cabinet meeting at the White House on January 29, Health and Human Services Secretary Robert F. Kennedy Jr. mentioned that the website will be operational "in 10 days," although no specific launch date was provided.

The website was launched on February 5, 2026.

== Service ==
TrumpRx is a website that offers prescription drugs at a discounted price. The prices are benchmarked against those in Europe. Pfizer's negotiated discounts ranged from fifty to eighty-five percent.

The website does not sell drugs directly. Rather, it enables consumers to buy specific prescription medications directly from pharmaceutical companies at reduced prices, without going through their insurance. The aim is to reduce out-of-pocket expenses for consumers, especially those who pay cash or do not have extensive drug coverage.

The website is designed by the National Design Studio.

=== Drugs ===
According to an initial statement from the Trump administration, TrumpRx will provide Eucrisa, Xeljanz, and Zavzpret. In October 2025, the Trump administration reached a deal with AstraZeneca; a website from AstraZeneca, named AstraZeneca Direct, included Farxiga, Airsupra, and FluMist as eligible for direct pricing. That month, EMD Serono agreed to offer its gonadotropin preparation drugs, including Gonal-f, on TrumpRx. AmgenNow, a website from Amgen that offers Repatha, is additionally set to appear on TrumpRx.

At its launch on February 5, 2026, 43 drugs were available on TrumpRx. The White House plans to add more drugs over time. In February 2026, more than half of the medications listed on TrumpRx had or would soon have a more affordable generic version available through direct-to-consumer platforms, including GoodRx and Mark Cuban's Cost Plus Drugs. A White House spokesperson mentioned that while cheaper alternatives may exist for certain items on TrumpRx, the site's main advantage lies in offering the lowest-cost options for branded products.

On May 18, 2026, President Trump announced an expansion of the TrumpRx website, adding over 600 generic medications through collaborations with Amazon Pharmacy, GoodRx, and Cost Plus Drugs.

On June 5, 2026, Trump announced the addition of another 160 drugs to the platform.

== Responses ==
=== Political ===
Bloomberg News described TrumpRx as an instance of Trump using the federal government as an avenue for shareholder activism.

Senate Democrats, including Ron Wyden, have characterized TrumpRx as resembling a marketing or coupon-based strategy that fails to effectively lower pharmacy costs for the majority of Americans. They have called for the disclosure of the terms negotiated with manufacturers such as Pfizer and AstraZeneca and have urged regulators to delay the implementation of the initiative until these questions are addressed. Democratic lawmakers also highlight their own policy proposals such as Medicare negotiation, oversight of pharmaceutical benefit managers (PBMs), and price caps on essential medications as more effective means of reducing drug prices, asserting that TrumpRx does not enhance or replace these measures.

Democratic Senators Dick Durbin, Elizabeth Warren, and Peter Welch raised concerns regarding questionable prescribing practices, potential conflicts of interest, and insufficient care related to the specific types of direct-to-consumer (DTC) platforms to which TrumpRx would direct patients. California Governor Gavin Newsom described TrumpRx as a copy of CalRx, which offered insulin for a set price and offered under CalRx branding.

=== Industry and health ===
The deal reached with the Trump administration secured Pfizer a reprieve from tariffs on the pharmaceutical industry, threatened to be 100 percent.

According to The New York Times, TrumpRx does not provide meaningful discounts for insurance beneficiaries.

=== Public opinion ===
A February 2026 YouGov survey found broad support for the new government website when it is not called TrumpRx: 57% approve and 19% disapprove. When the name TrumpRx is used, approval drops to 41% and disapproval rises to 31%. The name has the strongest negative effect among Democrats. Approval falls from 45% to 13% when TrumpRx is mentioned, and disapproval jumps from 27% to 62%. Independents show a similar pattern: approval drops from 49% to 21%, and opinions split evenly (31% approve, 31% disapprove) when the name is used. Republican support remains steady, with strong approval whether or not the name is cited (78% vs. 81%). Mentioning TrumpRx also reduces intended use overall: those "not at all likely" to use the site rise from 35% to 44%. Democrats' reluctance increases sharply (50% to 74%), as does Independents' (32% to 45%). Republicans, however, become more likely to use it when the name is mentioned, with "not at all likely" dropping from 23% to 15% and "very likely" rising from 9% to 20%. Overall, the name boosts Republican enthusiasm but lowers broader public support and usage.

== See also ==
- Branding of United States government programs and facilities after Donald Trump
- HealthCare.gov – health insurance exchange website
- Prescription drug prices in the United States

== Works cited ==
- Andrews, Rachel; Whyte, Liz; Loftus, Peter (September 30, 2025). "White House Unveils 'TrumpRx' Drug-Buying Site and a Pfizer Pricing Deal". The Wall Street Journal.
- Garde, Damian; Zhang, Rachel; Lowenkron, Hadriana (September 30, 2025). "Pfizer's Drug Price Cuts Yield Three-Year Trump Tariff Reprieve". Bloomberg News.
- Kitchener, Caroline; Pager, Tyler; Robbins, Rebecca; Kliff, Sarah (October 16, 2025). "Hailing an Era of 'Trump Babies,' White House Unveils I.V.F. Proposals". The New York Times.
- Levine, Alexandra; Wagner, Kurt (October 13, 2025). "Trump's TikTok Deal Puts the White House in the Driver's Seat". Bloomberg News.
- Muller, Madison (October 6, 2025). "New Amgen Website Offers Repatha at 60% Off After Trump Pressure". Bloomberg News.
- Robbins, Rebecca; Sanger-Katz, Margot (September 30, 2025). "Trump Announces Deal With Pfizer to Sell Drugs to Medicaid at European Prices". The New York Times.
- Robbins, Rebecca (October 1, 2025). "How Trump's Online Drugstore May Affect Your Drug Costs". The New York Times.
- Robbins, Rebecca; Sanger-Katz, Margot (October 10, 2025). "Trump Announces a Deal on Drug Prices With AstraZeneca". The New York Times.
- Temple-West, Patrick (September 30, 2025). "US announces direct-to-consumer 'TrumpRx' drug sales programme". Financial Times.
- Zhang, Rachel; Woodhouse, Skylar (September 19, 2025). "US Weighs Trump-Branded Website to Help Shop for Cheaper Drugs". Bloomberg News.
- Zhang, Rachel; Muller, Madison; Furlong, Ashleigh (October 10, 2025). "Trump Announces AstraZeneca Drug Price Cuts for Tariff Reprieve". Bloomberg News.
- Zhang, Rachel; Nix, Jessica; Wind, Sonja (October 16, 2025). "Trump Strikes Deal With Merck KGaA on Tariffs, IVF Costs". Bloomberg News.
