= Accomable =

Travel and holiday companies of the United Kingdom

Accomable was an accessible travel startup that helped disabled people find and book adapted holiday accommodation worldwide online. Founded by Srin Madipalli and Martyn Sibley, two childhood friends who have Spinal Muscular Atrophy, the company was based in London, and was acquired by Airbnb in 2017.

== Background ==
Accomable listed holiday accommodations with a range of accessibility features, including step-free entry, roll-in showers, hoists, height-adjustable beds and other equipment for guests with disabilities.

Accomable CEO and co-founder, Srin Madipalli, developed the concept for Accomable in 2011 while travelling on a six month break from his City law job in London. Madipalli quit his law job and enrolled as an MBA at Saïd Business School (2013) where he developed an interest in tech and startups. The site was launched in the summer of 2015.

== Developments ==
In May 2016, Accomable secured £300,000 seed funding from undisclosed private investors. The company also received a grant from the Skoll Centre for Entrepreneurship based at Oxford University, where Mr Madipalli did his MBA, via an initiative to support ventures that deliver social impact.

An Accomable documentary short film was shortlisted at the 2015 UN Enable Film Festival in New York.

== Airbnb acquisition ==
In 2017, Airbnb acquired Accomable for an undisclosed amount to improve accessibility across the platform. As part of the acquisition, Srin Madipalli joined Airbnb as Accessibility Product and Program Manager in San Francisco.
