= Advanced Accelerator Applications =

France-based pharmaceutical group

- Industry: Pharmaceuticals
- Founded: 2002
- Headquarters: Saint-Genis-Pouilly, France
- Key people: Sidonie Golombowski-Daffner, Chairperson and President
- Products: Gluscan, Dopaview, Fluorochol/Aaacholine, Netspot, Somakit Toc
- Number of employees: >1000
- Parent: Novartis
- Website: adacap.com

Advanced Accelerator Applications (AAA or Adacap) is a France-based pharmaceutical group, specialized in the field of nuclear medicine. The group operates in all three segments of nuclear medicine (PET, SPECT and therapy) to diagnose and treat serious conditions in the fields of oncology, neurology, cardiology, infectious and inflammatory diseases.

In late October 2017, Reuters announced that Novartis would acquire the company for $3.9 billion, paying $41 per ordinary share and $82 per American depositary share representing a 47 percent premium. On January 22, 2018, Novartis AG announced the successful completion of the tender offer by its subsidiary, Novartis Groupe France S.A.

== History ==
AAA was created in 2002 by Italian physicist Stefano Buono to exploit a patent from the European Organization for Nuclear Research (CERN).

AAA currently has a total of 31 sites in 12 countries, including: 19 production facilities in 8 countries (in Europe and the U.S.) that manufacture targeted radioligand therapies and precision imaging radioligands, and 6 sites with R&D activity.

In October 2017, Novartis announced that it intended to acquire the company for US$3.9 billion. The acquisition was completed in January 2018.

In January 2024, AAA announced plans to expand manufacturing capabilities and build additional RLT supply facilities in Sasayama, Japan, and Haiyan, Zhejiang, China.

In August 2024, Siemens Healthineers bought the diagnostic arm of Advanced Accelerator Applications that specialises in producing radioactive chemicals used for cancer scan for more than $224 million.

== Products ==
AAA has a portfolio of diagnostic and therapeutic applications and products in the fields of Molecular Imaging and Therapy. The group's portfolio of radiopharmaceuticals includes radioactive agents for positron emission tomography (PET) imaging as well as single-photon emission computed tomography (SPECT) diagnostic products.

=== Lutathera ===
The company's lead product is LUTATHERA, a Lutetium Lu 177 dotatate labeled somatostatin analogue peptide, a theragnostic cancer product being developed to treat certain gastro-entero pancreatic neuroendocrine tumors (GEP-NETs). It selectively targets over-expressed somatostatin receptors while also giving off gamma emissions to allow physicians to visualize where in the body both the drug and the tumor are. It was approved by the FDA in January 2018 for GEP-NET.

==== Approval ====
Lutathera, also known as lutetium Lu 177 dotatate, is a target treatment drug for patients with GEP-NETs. Its approval for Advanced Accelerator Applications was announced on January 26, 2018, by the US Food and Drug Administration. Lutathera is most notable as the first FDA approved peptide receptor radionuclide therapy (PRRT) to combat GEP-NETs.

===== GEP-NETs =====
GEP-NETs are rare groups of cancer that continue to proliferate, regardless of initial therapy treatments. They are present in areas affected by pancreatic or gastrointestinal cancers; specifically, the pancreas, stomach, intestines, colon and rectum.

==== Use ====
Lutathera is used to combat pancreatic and gastrointestinal cancers that do not respond well to common chemotherapeutical treatments; namely for patients with somatostatin receptor-positive GEP-NETs. These receptors are commonly found on tumors located in the foregut, midgut, and hindgut.

==== Mechanism ====
Lutathera is a radioactive drug consisting of a tyrosine-containing somatostatin analog Tyr3-octreotate (TATE) attached to the chelating agent tetraazacyclododecanetetra-acetic acid (DOTA). Attached to the dotatate is the radioactive marker Lu-177, a radioisotope. The dotatate binds to the GEP-NET positive somatostatin receptor cells commonly present on neuroendocrine tumors. After binding to the receptor, Lutathera enters the cell and uses its radioactive property to damage DNA. This mechanism effectively triggers apoptosis of cancerous tumor cells. As a result, studies found that 16% of patients being treated with Lutathera experienced either complete or partial tumor shrinkage.

==== Studies ====
FDA approval of Lutathera was ultimately supported by two clinical studies. NETTER-1, a Phase 3 study, was a randomized clinical trial which included patients with a severe form of somatostatin receptor-positive NETs. The study compared Lutathera treatment with a standard dose of octreotided LAR against a high-dose of octreotide LAR. Researchers measured tumor growth after the course of the treatment, also known as progression-free survival. The study concluded that patients who were treated with Lutathera lived substantially longer compared to those who only received the octreotide treatment. They experienced a 79% reduction in death and cancer progression.

The Netherlands study gathered several patients with somatostatin receptor-positive tumors, including patients with GEP-NETs. The study found that 16% of patients with GEP-NETs, who were treated with Lutathera, experienced complete or partial tumor shrinkage. As a result, a pre-planned interim overall survival analysis found that Lutathera treatment lead to a 48% reduction in risk of death.

==== Common Grade 3-4 Adverse Reactions ====
Common problems	Symptoms/Reactions	Percent of patients affected
	Nausea	5%
	Vomiting	7%
	Hyperglycemia	4%
	Hypokalemia	4%
Liver problems		
	Increased Gamma-Glutamyl Transferase	20%
	Elevated AST	5%
	Increased ALT	4%
	Tumor bleeding	
	Swelling (edema)	
	Tissue injury (necrosis)	
Bone Marrow problems		
	Myelodysplastic syndrome	2%
	Acute leukemia	1%
Kidney problems		
	Kidney failure	2%
Neuroendocrine hormonal crisis		
	Hypotension	1%
	Bronchospasm	
Myelosuppression		1%
	Lymphopenia	44%
	Anemia	
	Thrombocytopenia	
	Leukopenia	
	Neutropenia	
Cardiac problems		
	Myocardial infarction	1%
	Cardiac failure	2%
Embryo-Fetal Toxicity		
	Causes harm to unborn fetuses	
Temporary Infertility		
	May cause infertility	

==== Advances ====
Lutathera is a major technological advancement for the detection of tumors. Diagnostic imaging that relies on dotatates can now rely on Lutathera to locate somatostatin receptor-positive tumors by tagging them with its radioactive component. This tagging of tumors will allow them to become more visible during positron emission tomography (PET) scans. With LU-177 dotatates, more somatostatin receptor-positive GEP-NET patients can be identified for treatment of the disease.

=== LysaKare ===
LysaKare received a marketing authorisation valid throughout the EU on 25 July 2019.

LysaKare protect the kidneys from radiation damage during cancer treatment with a radioactive medicine called lutetium (177Lu) oxodotreotide. LysaKare is for use in adults and contains the active substances arginine and lysine.

== Pipeline ==
AAA has a broad pipeline of products in development, including several theragnostic pairings for oncology indications.

NETSPOT and SomaKit TOC are novel kits for radiolabeling somatostatin analogue peptides to help diagnose somatostatin receptor-positive NET lesions. Each kit has received orphan drug designation from both the EMA and the FDA.

99MTc-rhAnnexin V-128, a SPECT investigational candidate for the diagnosis and assessment of apoptotic and necrotic processes, which are present in a number of pathological conditions in oncology and cardiovascular disease, as well as in autoimmune disorders. 99MTc-rhAnnexin V-128 is currently in a Phase I/II trial for the diagnosis of rheumatoid arthritis and ankylosing spondylitis, as well as several Phase II studies in cardiovascular, cardio-oncology, and pulmonary indications.

^{177}Lu-PSMA-617 and ^{68}Ga-PSMA-617 are in development to treat, image, monitor and stage prostate cancer. PSMA-617 is a ligand of prostate-specific membrane antigen (PSMA) expressed on the majority of prostate tumor cells. ^{177}Lu-PSMA-617 also known as lutetium (^{177}Lu) vipivotide tetraxetan is being developed to treat prostate cancer by binding to PSMA-617. In June 2021 it was granted a breakthrough therapy designation. ^{68}Ga-PSMA-617 is under development as a complementary diagnostic candidate.

CTT1057 is an 18F-labeled investigational diagnostic candidate in development for PET imaging of prostate cancer. CTT1057 is a phosphoramidate-based peptide, which specifically binds to Prostate-Specific Membrane Antigen (PSMA), expressed on the majority of prostate tumor cells.

177LuNeoBOMB1 and 68GaNeoBOMB1 are new generation antagonist bombesin analogs in development to treat, image, monitor and stage gastrin-releasing peptide receptor (GRPR)-expressing malignancies, such as such as gastrointestinal stromal tumors (GIST), prostate cancer and breast cancer. 177LuNeoBOMB1 is a therapeutic candidate and 68GaNeoBOMB1 is its complementary diagnostic candidate.

== Millburn site ==
In 2016, AAA opened a light manufacturing and distribution site in Millburn, NJ, a residential town in North Jersey. When the site was first purchased, it caused substantial concerns among local residents. Per the requests of Millburn Residents, the Township Committee hired a nuclear/radiology expert to re-assess the appropriateness of opening a radioactive manufacturing site in the residential area. The expert concluded that the proposed operations at AAA are safe and pose no hazard to the citizens of Millburn.
