= Joshua S. Goldstein =

American academic (born 1952)

Joshua S. Goldstein (born December 27, 1952) is professor emeritus of international relations at American University. He graduated with a BA from Stanford University in 1981 and earned his doctorate at MIT 1986. He was appointed professor in 1993. He was on the faculty at the University of Southern California and American University and was a research scholar in political science at University of Massachusetts, Amherst. In 1993, he founded the Bosnia Support Committee, which he chaired for two years. Goldstein co-wrote the documentary film Nuclear Now with director Oliver Stone.

== Long cycles theory ==
Goldstein in 1988 posited a 'hegemony cycle' of 150 years' duration, the four hegemonic powers since 1494 being;

1, Hapsburg Spain, 1494–1648; ended by the Thirty Years War, in which Spain itself was the 'challenger'; the Treaty of Westphalia and the beginnings of the nation-state.

2, the Netherlands, 1648–1815; ended by the challenge from France of the revolutionary and Napoleonic wars, the Treaty of Vienna and introduction of the Congress System

3, Great Britain, 1815–1945; ended by Germany's challenge in two World Wars, and the postwar settlement, including the World Bank, IMF, GATT, the United Nations and NATO.

4, the United States, since 1945

Goldstein suggests that US hegemony may 'at an indeterminate time' be challenged and ended by China (the 'best fit'), by western Europe, Japan, or (writing in 1988) the USSR. The situation is unstable due to the continuance of Machiavellian power politics and the deployment of nuclear weapons. The choice lies between 'global cooperation or global suicide'. Thus there may be 'an end to hegemony itself'.

Goldstein speculates that Venetian hegemony, ceded to Spain in 1494, may have begun in 1350

== Selected publications ==
- Long Cycles: Prosperity and War in the Modern Age. Yale University Press. 1988. This book examines the causes of the Kondratiev Wave, identifying production, prices, war, innovation, investment and real wages as factors. It also identifies a longer 'hegemony cycle' of 150 years' duration. Goldstein returned to this subject in 2005 in a paper, "Predictive power of long wave theory, 1989-2004".
- The Real Price of War: How You Pay for the War on Terror. New York University Press. 2005. ISBN 0814731627. OCLC 62726646.
- International Relations. Longman. 2007.
- War and Gender: How Gender Shapes the War System and Vice Versa. Cambridge University Press. 2009. ISBN 9780521807166. OCLC 965910926.
- Goldstein, Joshua S. (2011). Winning the War on War: The Decline of Armed Conflict Worldwide. Penguin. ISBN 978-0-452-29859-0.

== See also ==
- Historic recurrence
