= National Design Studio =

Agency within the White House Office

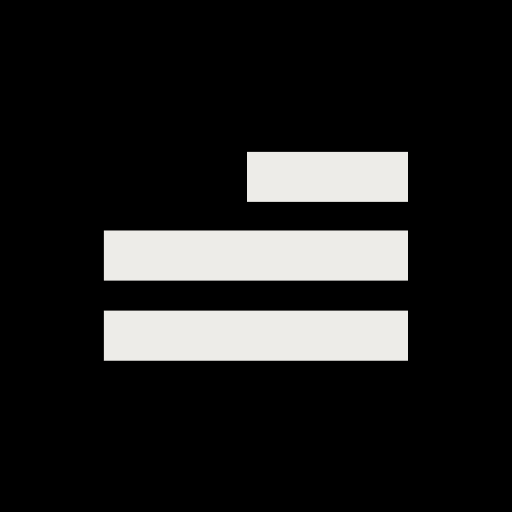

Agency overview
- Formed: August 21, 2025; 12 months ago
- Headquarters: Eisenhower Executive Office Building, Washington, D.C., U.S.
- Agency executive: Joe Gebbia, Chief Design Officer
- Parent department: White House Office
- Website: ndstudio.gov

The National Design Studio is an agency of the White House Office. The National Design Studio's work has drawn both praise and criticism. High profile projects include the design of Realfood.gov, TrumpAccounts.gov, TrumpRx.gov, and Login.gov. Supporters have credited the office with elevating design within the federal government, while critics, including former federal technologists, privacy advocates, and design professionals, have questioned the practical impact of its website redesigns and its compliance with federal privacy and accessibility law.

== History ==
On August 21, 2025, Bloomberg News reported that president Donald Trump had signed an executive order establishing the position of chief design officer of the United States and that Trump had appointed Joe Gebbia, a co-founder of Airbnb who was involved in the Department of Government Efficiency initiative, to the position. The order established the National Design Studio, led by the chief design officer. The National Design Studio is set to close three years from the signing of the order. Gebbia confirmed his appointment four days later. According to Wired, Gebbia was originally set to join the United States DOGE Service, but sought to have his own office.

== Organization ==
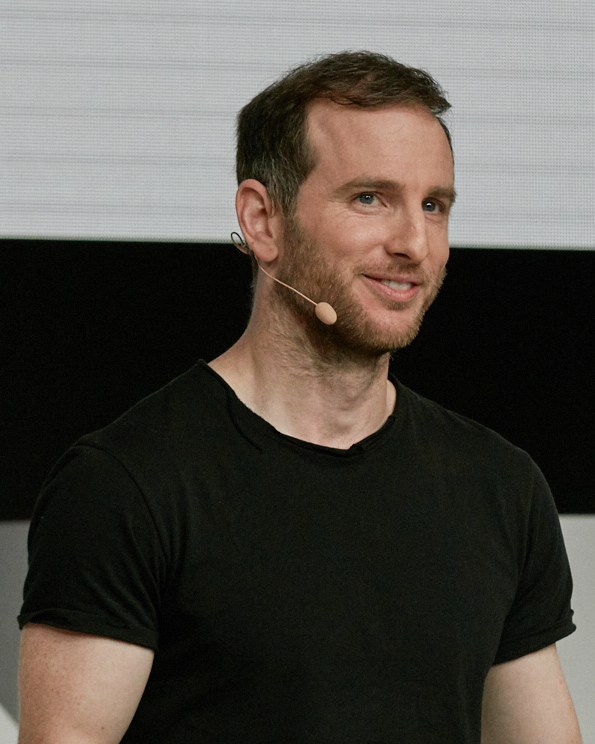
Joe Gebbia, the chief design officer of the United States, was appointed to oversee the National Design Studio.

The National Design Studio operates within the White House Office. Similar to the United States DOGE Service, it contains a temporary organization. The administrator of the office and the temporary organization, a position that was not immediately occupied, reports directly to the White House chief of staff. The National Design Studio operates out of the Eisenhower Executive Office Building.

According to Wired, the National Design Studio is separate from the Department of Government Efficiency, but employees of the latter organization—including Kaitlyn Koller, a former Senate Committee on Foreign Relations aide—joined the National Design Studio. In addition, the National Design Studio's work includes contracts with private designers and studios. Reuters later reported that Edward Coristine had joined the National Design Studio.

== Work with other agencies ==
Trump's order establishing the National Design Studio required federal agencies to "produce initial results" by July 4, 2026, the United States semiquincentennial. In accordance with the order, the administrator of the General Services Administration must consult with the chief design officer to modify the U.S. Web Design System, and individual agencies must consult with the chief design officer to ensure designs comply with the 21st Century Integrated Digital Experience Act, although the requirement has been quietly walked back from the Trump order. According to Reuters, Gebbia's initial focus was at the Internal Revenue Service. An official within the Trump administration described the National Design Studio as an apparent "stripped-down successor" to the Department of Government Efficiency. Gebbia later told Dezeen that the National Design Studio's work would focus on the ten most-visited government websites.

== Responsibilities ==
The National Design Studio was tasked with overseeing online interfaces and physical environments to be "both usable and beautiful", an initiative labeled "America by Design". On X, Gebbia compared the eventual product of the National Design Studio's work to the "satisfying" usability of the Apple Store. According to David Sacks, the special advisor for AI and crypto, Gebbia's responsibilities included the "redesign of roughly 26,000 federal web portals".

The National Design Studio manages several websites, including americabydesign.gov and ndstudio.gov. In October 2025, it began managing techforce.gov. The National Design Studio's design work includes trumpcard.gov, genesis.energy.gov, trumprx.gov, realfood.gov, trumpaccounts.gov and safedc.gov. The National Design Studio's websites include material generated by artificial intelligence. In December 2025, Fast Company reported that the National Design Studio was using Figma Make, a prototyping tool that uses artificial intelligence.

== Responses ==
=== Positive reception ===
Some observers praised the visual design of the National Design Studio's early websites, and others described the creation of the chief design officer role as a milestone for giving design formal standing within the White House.

=== Critical reception ===
The Architect's Newspaper's Elizabeth Goodspeed critiqued the National Design Studio as resolving "a problem no one actually has". Ars Technica reported that a year after its creation, the National Design Studio had launched mostly single-page websites relying heavily on AI-generated content and that the requirement in Trump's executive order for the studio to help update federal web design standards had quietly been dropped. Nextgov reported that former government designers, including ex-Obama administration creative director Ashleigh Axios and former U.S. Digital Service designer Rachael Dietkus, criticized the National Design Studio's shift toward a "consumer brand" design ethos.

=== Legal concerns ===
According to NOTUS, three of the National Design Studio's websites failed an accessibility audit from Equalize Digital and did not appear to comply with the Web Content Accessibility Guidelines, which cover federal regulations, including the Section 508 Amendment to the Rehabilitation Act of 1973. A Guardian investigation found that four of the National Design Studio's public websites ran commercial visitor-tracking software configured to evade common browser privacy tools, without the disclosures required under the Privacy Act of 1974 and the E-Government Act of 2002. Corroborating and advancing earlier reporting done by Audrey Henson of The Drey Dossier, the investigation also found that the studio had built unlaunched, White House-controlled versions of vote.gov and a passport-application portal that duplicated services legally assigned to the Election Assistance Commission and the State Department, and that questions remain about oversight and funding of the studio.

The National Design Studio's website displayed photos and links to private companies without explanation. Craig Holman, a lobbyist with the advocacy group Public Citizen, said displaying the logos was "illegal for any governmental official to use public office for personal enrichment, including the enrichment of any specific private business or corporation," while Demand Progress policy director Emily Peterson-Cassin said it "reeks of both corruption and incompetence."
