= HotelTonight =

Online travel agency

Hotel Tonight, Inc.
- Website type: Online travel agency
- Founded: December 2010; 15 years ago
- Headquarters: San Francisco, California
- Area served: United States, Canada, Mexico, Caribbean, United Kingdom, France, Spain, Germany, Italy, Australia, Japan
- Owner: Airbnb
- Founders: Sam Shank; Jared Simon; Chris Bailey
- Industry: Hotel, Tourism
- Services: Travel agency
- Website: hoteltonight.com
- Native clients on: iOS; Android

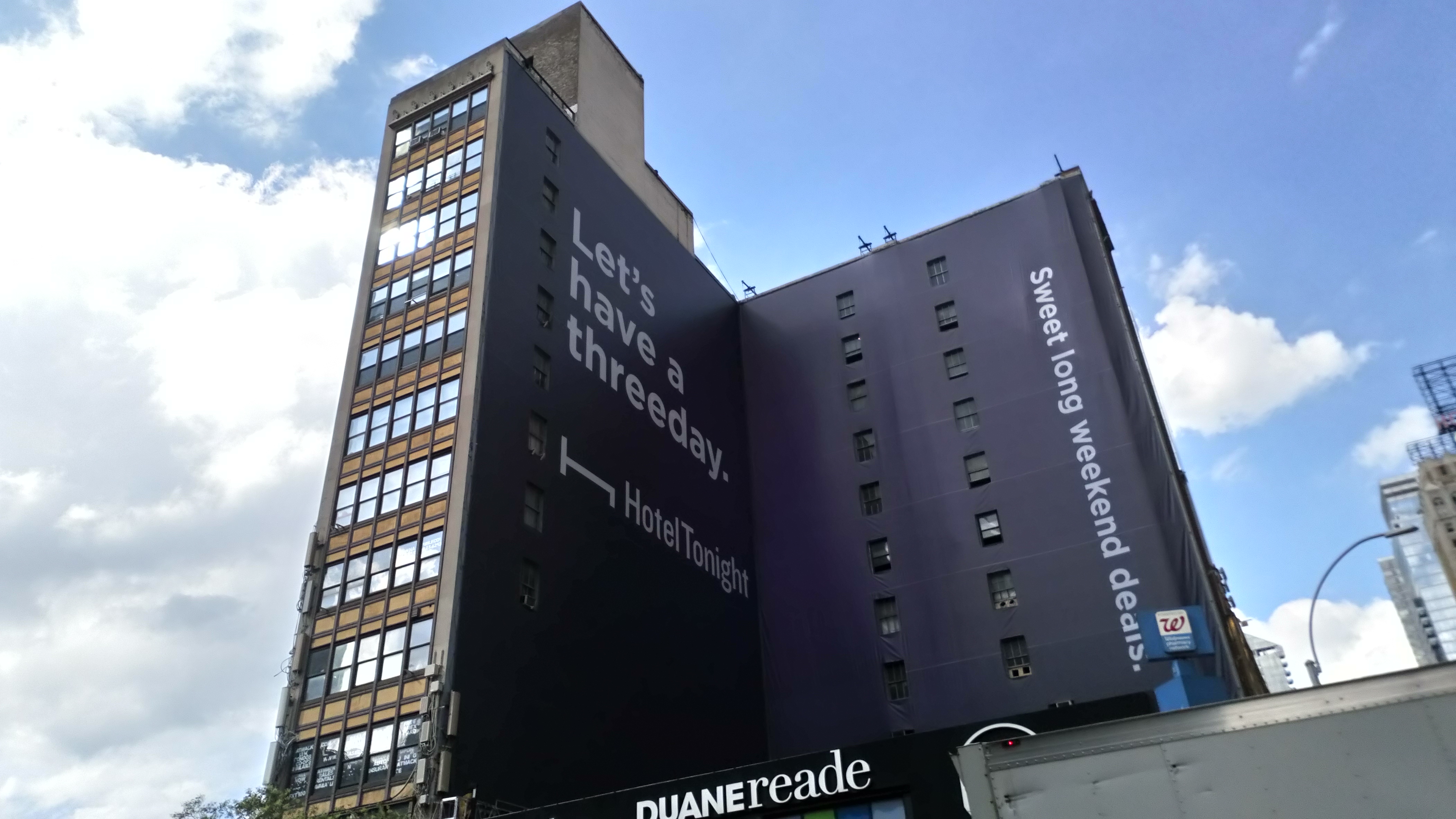
HotelTonight advertisement in New York City.

HotelTonight is a travel agency and metasearch engine. It serves for users to book last-minute lodging in the Americas, Europe, Japan and Australia.

== History ==
HotelTonight was founded in December 2010 by Sam Shank, Jared Simon, and Chris Bailey. It first launched in January 2011, in the US on the iPhone App Store. The app later launched on Google Play in July 2011 and serves cities in Europe, Canada, Central America and South America.

== Fundraising ==
In May 2011, the company raised a $3.25 million Series A round from Battery Ventures, Accel Partners, and First Round Capital. In November 2011, they raised $9 million from Accel Partners, Battery Ventures, and First Round Capital. In June 2012, a Series C round from U.S. Venture Partners, Accel Partners, Battery Ventures, and First Round Capital raised another $23 million. In September 2013, the company raised $45 million in a Series D round led by Coatue Management, bringing its total funding to $80.5 million.

== Operations ==
In October 2014, HotelTonight expanded from same-day only bookings to allowing users to book rooms up to 7 days in advance. In September 2018, they began allowing bookings through the website.

In March 2019, HotelTonight was acquired by Airbnb for approximately $450 million in cash and stock.
