= Joe Gebbia =

American businessman (born 1981)

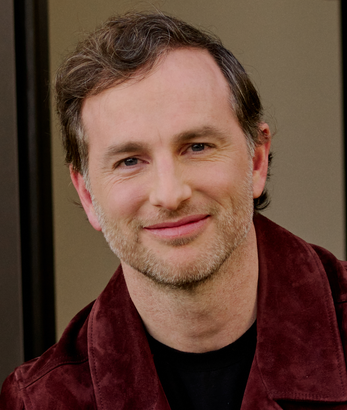
- Gebbia in 2024

Chief Design Officer of the United States
- Incumbent
- Assumed office August 21, 2025
- President: Donald Trump
- Preceded by: Position established

Personal details
- Born: Joseph Gebbia Jr. August 21, 1981 (age 45) Atlanta, Georgia, U.S.
- Party: Republican
- Spouse: Isabelle Boemeke
- Children: 1
- Education: Rhode Island School of Design (BFA)
- Website: Official website

Joseph Gebbia Jr. (/ˈdʒɛbiə/; born August 21, 1981) is an American designer and entrepreneur, and a co-founder of Airbnb. In 2025, he joined the Department of Government Efficiency (DOGE). Gebbia was appointed by President Donald Trump as the first Chief Design Officer to lead the National Design Studio.

Gebbia is also on the board of directors of Airbnb, but has not been involved in the operations of the company since 2022. In 2022, Gebbia joined the board of Tesla Inc. and bought a minority stake in the San Antonio Spurs basketball team. He also co-founded Samara, an accessory dwelling unit startup.

== Early life ==
Gebbia was born August 21, 1981, in Atlanta, Georgia, the son of Eileen and Joe Gebbia, independent health food sales representatives. Gebbia is of Italian and Irish ancestry and has one sister, Kimberly. He grew up in Lawrenceville, Georgia and attended Brookwood High School in nearby Snellville.

In 2005, Gebbia graduated from the Rhode Island School of Design (RISD) with a Bachelor of Fine Arts degree in Graphic Design and Industrial Design. Gebbia took supplementary business-related classes at Brown University and Massachusetts Institute of Technology (MIT) while attending RISD.

== Career ==
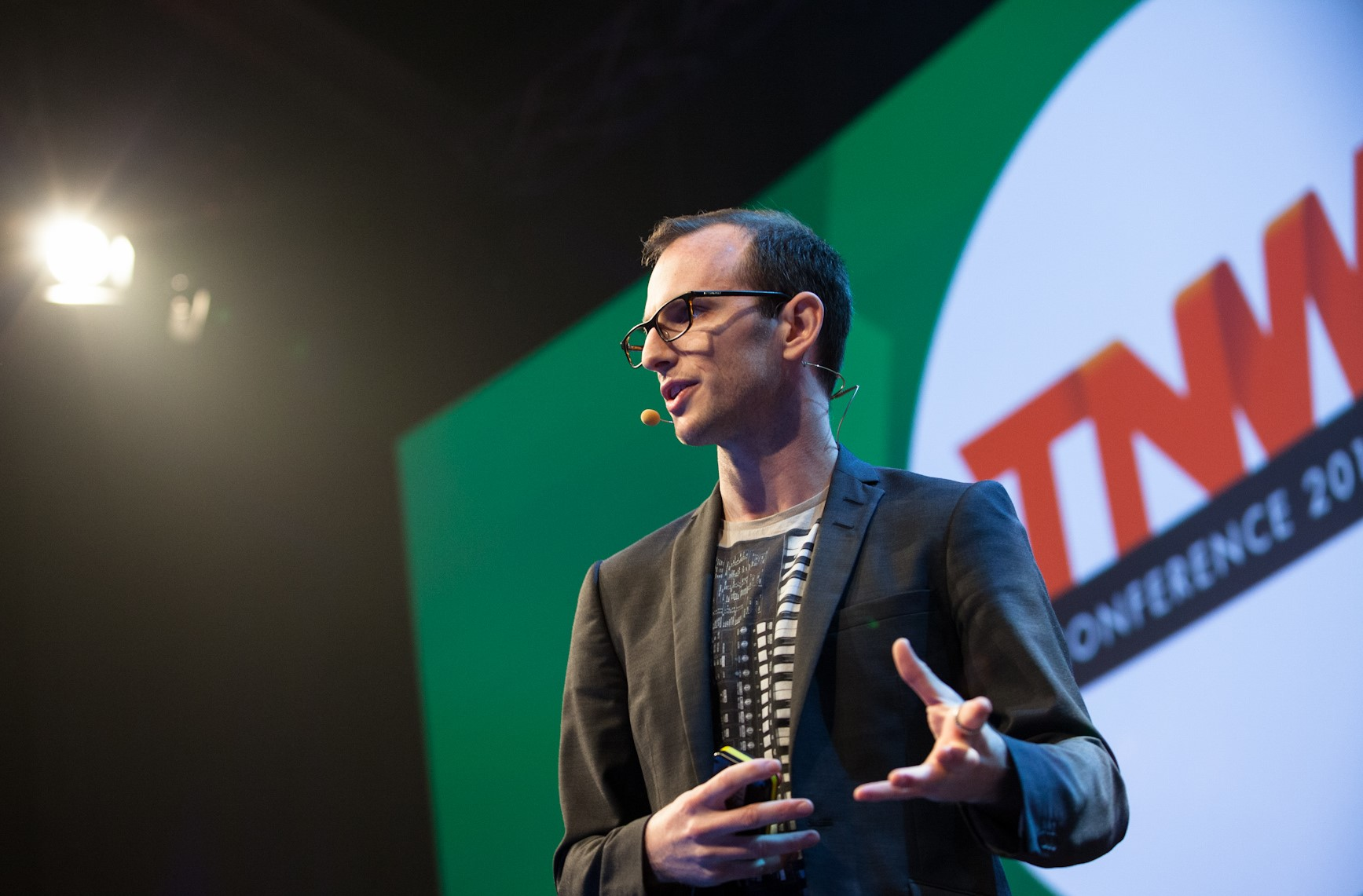
Gebbia at the 2012 TNW Conference in Amsterdam

After graduating from RISD, Gebbia moved to San Francisco to work as a designer for Chronicle Books. He also founded Ecolect, a green-design website. In 2007, Brian Chesky, his classmate at RISD, moved in with him, and they both quit their jobs to start a company together. Gebbia came up with the idea of renting out airbeds in their apartment. They marketed the beds by creating a website called "AirBed & Breakfast.” In March 2009, the name of the company was shortened to Airbnb.com, and the site's content had expanded from air beds and shared spaces to properties including entire homes, apartments, and private rooms.

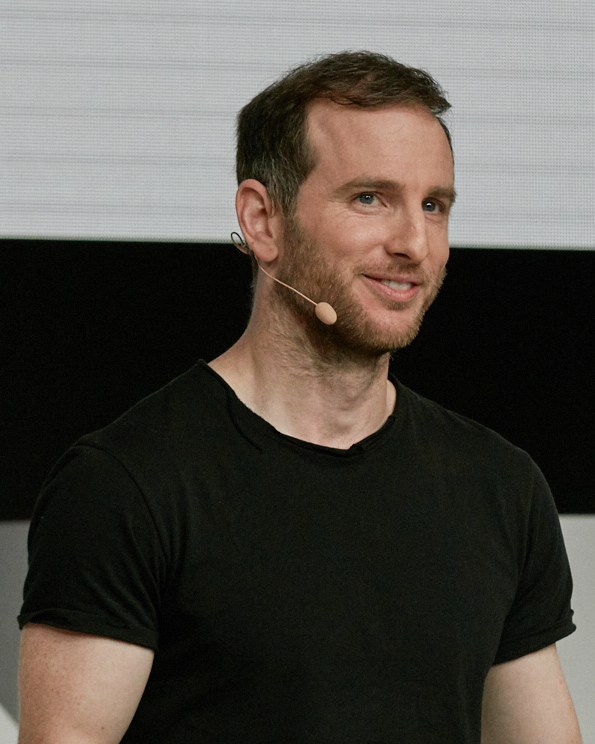
Gebbia in 2017

In May 2017, Gebbia launched Neighborhood, a modular designed office furniture business. The furniture was created for Bernhardt Design, a furniture company that has worked with emerging designers. Gebbia supported the newly formed Eames Institute, aimed at broadening the influence of Ray and Charles Eames through exhibitions from the Eames Collection.

On December 10, 2020, Airbnb became a public company via an initial public offering, raising $3.5 billion. In January 2022, Gebbia acquired a minority ownership stake in the San Antonio Spurs, joining billionaire Michael Dell and San Francisco-based global investment firm Sixth Street Partners as fellow investors. In July 2022, Gebbia stepped down from his full-time operating role at Airbnb, while remaining on the board of directors in an advisory role. In September 2022, Gebbia was appointed by Tesla, Inc. to its board of directors. Samara, formerly a research and development unit of Airbnb established in 2016, became an independent accessory dwelling unit (ADU) startup in 2022. Gebbia announced the launch of its first product in November 2022, a net-zero tiny house called Backyard.

=== Investments ===
Gebbia has invested in:

- Stark Bank, a corporate bank focusing on financial technology
- Vimcal, a calendar mobile app
- A minority ownership stake in the San Antonio Spurs

=== Documentary work ===
In 2020, Gebbia was an executive producer on the documentary film Universe, which follows jazz trumpeter Wallace Roney, a protégé of Miles Davis, as he convenes an orchestra to perform a rediscovered orchestral jazz suite by Wayne Shorter—written in 1966 for Miles Davis but never before performed. The film premiered weeks after Roney died from complications of COVID-19, making it one of the first films portraying the effects of the COVID-19 pandemic. Gebbia also executive produced a documentary titled We Dare to Dream, in partnership with XTR, following the 29-athlete Refugee Olympic Team at the Olympics before, during and after the 2020 Summer Olympics.

=== Work for DOGE ===
In 2025, Gebbia joined the Department of Government Efficiency (DOGE) as head of its National Design Studio (NDS). The studio's job is to improve the design of government websites. Gebbia said government websites, especially on mobile, are "horribly out of date" and he wants to create an "Apple Store-like experience."

Concern that Gebbia's work for DOGE undermined U.S. democracy resulted in calls to boycott Airbnb. In a Jan 19, 2025 post on X, Gebbia wrote that Trump "is not a fascist determined to destroy democracy" and that "I ... love the whole DOGE initiative."

Gebbia stepped down from the board of Airbnb.org, the company’s nonprofit arm that provides temporary housing for refugees and people displaced by disasters, in 2025, amid public controversy over anti-immigration comments he made in an interview. The resignation was announced in early April 2025 following backlash related to Gebbia’s recent outspoken criticism of certain refugee and migration policies and his visible political affiliations, which some felt were at odds with the humanitarian mission of Airbnb.org. Gebbia was also criticised on X where a clip of the comment went viral and users quickly pointed out that his wife is an immigrant from Brazil.

== Personal life ==
Gebbia lives in Austin, Texas. He is married to Brazilian model and influencer Isabelle Boemeke with whom he has a son.

=== Board memberships ===
Gebbia is on the board of directors of Airbnb; Samara, an accessory dwelling unit startup and Tesla Inc.

=== Politics ===
Gebbia used to be a Democrat. In 2025, Gebbia donated $1 million to the gubernatorial campaign of Greg Abbott. He has said that his politics have shifted towards the Republican Party over time. In the 2024 United States presidential election, he said he voted Republican. In 2025, Gebbia praised President Donald Trump's nomination of Robert F. Kennedy Jr. to United States Secretary of Health and Human Services.

Gebbia gave at least $2 million to Andrew Cuomo's PAC for the 2025 New York City mayoral election. Cuomo's opponent, Zohran Mamdani, wrote: "The single largest donor to a pro-Cuomo SuperPAC is Airbnb cofounder/board member Joe Gebbia, who promotes vile and racist messages about immigrants", attaching screenshots of said online posts from Twitter. Additionally, Kevin McCall of the New York Daily News said it was "disturbing that there has not been enough public comment about this dangerous and divisive rhetoric by Airbnb’s cofounder."

=== Philanthropy ===
Gebbia is among the youngest members to join The Giving Pledge committing to give more than half his wealth to philanthropic causes. Gebbia has made donations to service-led companies and projects, including Thorn and Educate Girls. A former scholarship recipient, in 2014, Gebbia donated $300,000 to his alma mater, RISD, to create an endowed fund that will make the school accessible for students in need of financial assistance. In 2017, Gebbia brought Yeonmi Park, a North Korean refugee as his guest to the Met Gala to bring attention to the issue of global-refugee security. Park was featured on the front page of the style section of The New York Times following the event.

In 2019, Gebbia donated to the Kevin Durant Charity Foundation which was used to redevelop basketball and tennis courts at playgrounds in Hayes Valley, San Francisco. In 2020, he and his team launched Airbnb.org, a non-profit that enables hosts on Airbnb to house people in times of crisis. In December 2020, during the COVID-19 pandemic, Gebbia made a $25 million donation to benefit two San Francisco charities working to end homelessness in the San Francisco Bay Area: Rising Up—Larkin Street Youth Services and All Home. In 2021, Gebbia was included on the list of America's 50 Biggest Charity Donors by The Chronicle of Philanthropy. In May 2022, while Gebbia was the graduation speaker at his alma mater, Brookwood High School, he pledged 22 shares of Airbnb stock to each of the 890 graduates, a gift worth a total of $2.1 million.

In February 2023, Gebbia made a $25 million gift to The Ocean Cleanup, the organization's largest private donation to date. The gift expands climate health and ocean sustainability operations across oceans, rivers, recycling, and research. Funds particularly support deployment of the organization's System 03 cleaning technology in the Great Pacific Garbage Patch. In February 2023, Gebbia committed to donating $25 million to Malala Fund over a period of five years.

== In popular culture ==
Gebbia was portrayed by Brian Maya in the Disney+ comedy-drama series, The Best Heart Attack of My Life.
