= Stefano Buono =

Italian physicist (born 1966)

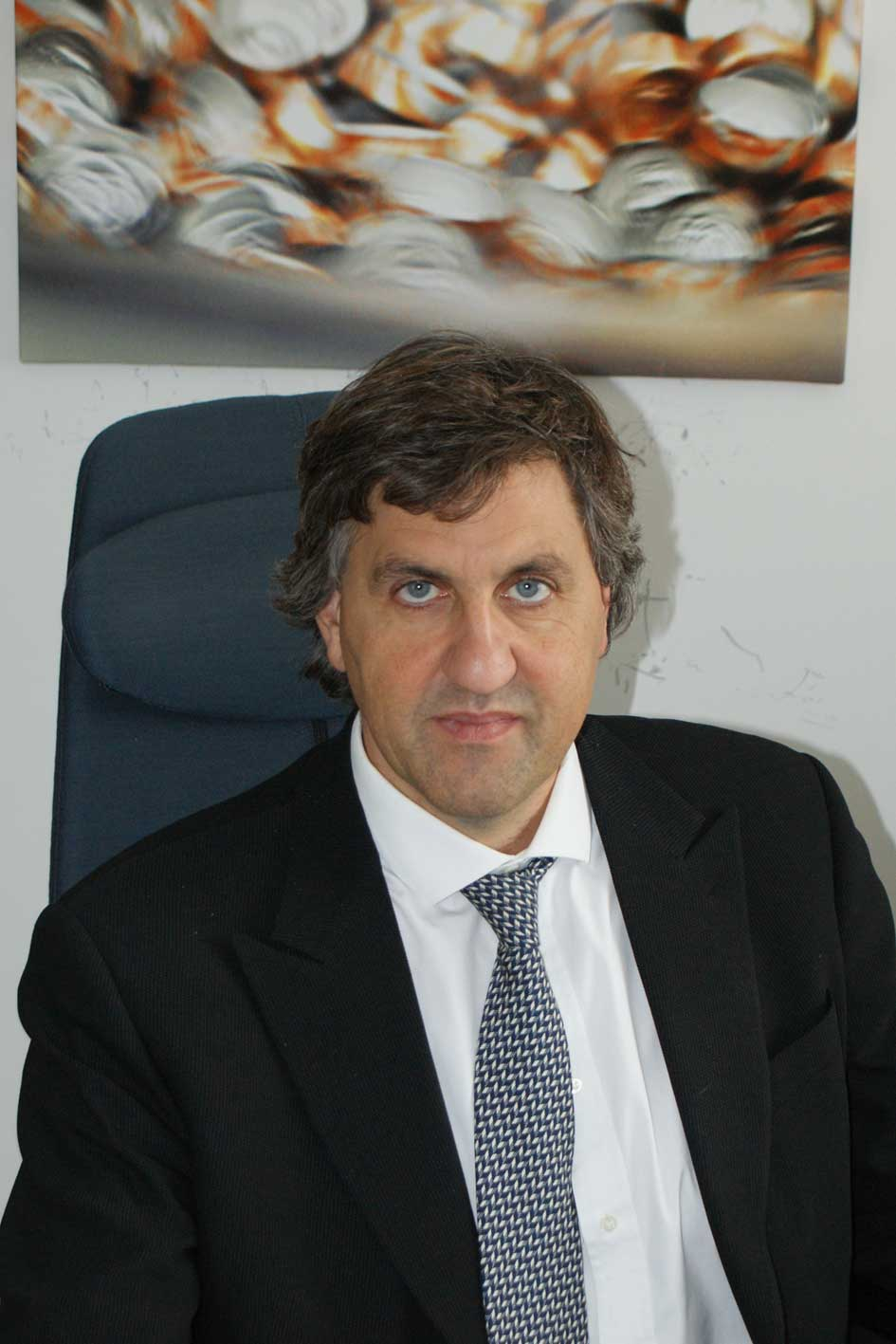
- Buono in 2014
- Born: 1966 (age 59–60); Avellino, Italy
- Education: University of Turin, Italy
- Known for: CEO and co-founder of newcleo
- Scientific career
- Fields: Physics

Stefano Buono (born 1966) is an Italian physicist, and the chief executive officer (CEO) of newcleo, a startup working in the design of small nuclear reactors, which uses waste from other reactors to power itself, he co-founded in 2021.

== Biography ==
Stefano Buono was born in 1966 in Avellino, Italy. He attended high school in Turin, Italy and received his master's degree in physics from the University of Turin in 1991.

== Career as physicist ==
Prior to founding Advanced Accelerator Applications in 2002, Buono worked at the Centre for Advanced Studies, Research and Development or CRS4. During his six years within CRS4, he headed a team of engineers working on different international research projects in the field of energy production and nuclear waste transmutation (Accelerator-Driven Systems). Before joining CRS4 and in parallel to his appointment at CRS4, Buono worked for approximately ten years with physics Nobel laureate Carlo Rubbia at CERN, one of the leading research laboratories for particle physics in the world. During that term, he also actively participated in the development of CERN's Adiabatic Resonance Crossing method.

== Advanced Accelerator Applications, Elysia Capital, Planet Smart City, LIFTT ==
In 2002, Buono founded Advanced Accelerator Applications (NASDAQ: AAAP), a radiopharmaceutical company that develops, produces and commercializes molecular nuclear medicine, diagnostic and therapeutic products. AAA traded on the Nasdaq Global Select Market under the ticker “AAAP.” The first day of trading was 11 November 2015. On January 22, 2018, Novartis AG acquired AAA.

Besides being a founder of Advanced Accelerator Applications, Buono has been its CEO and a member of its board of directors until January 2018.

In 2018, he founded Elysia Capital, a company based in London and Turin focused on social impact investments in the area of Sustainable Innovation, Wellbeing, Education, Art, and Culture. He became also Chairman of Planet Smart City, a worldwide leader in integrating smart solutions and social innovation practices in the design and development of large, affordable, smart real estate housing projects.

In 2019, Stefano Buono became Chairman of LIFTT, a not-only-profit investment holding focusing on innovation and technology transfer from research institutions.

== newcleo ==
In 2021, he co-founded and incorporated newcleo, a nuclear technology company of which he is CEO. Based in UK, Italy, France and Switzerland, the company raised EUR400m reaching in its first year of operation and it currently employs around 700 employees. Its goal is to bring forward the most sustainable strategy for the nuclear industry of the future, with innovations that increase safety, reduce costs, avoid mining, and dramatically reduce nuclear waste.

He is the author of numerous scientific publications.
