= Airbnb =

Online platform for short-term housing rentals

Airbnb, Inc.

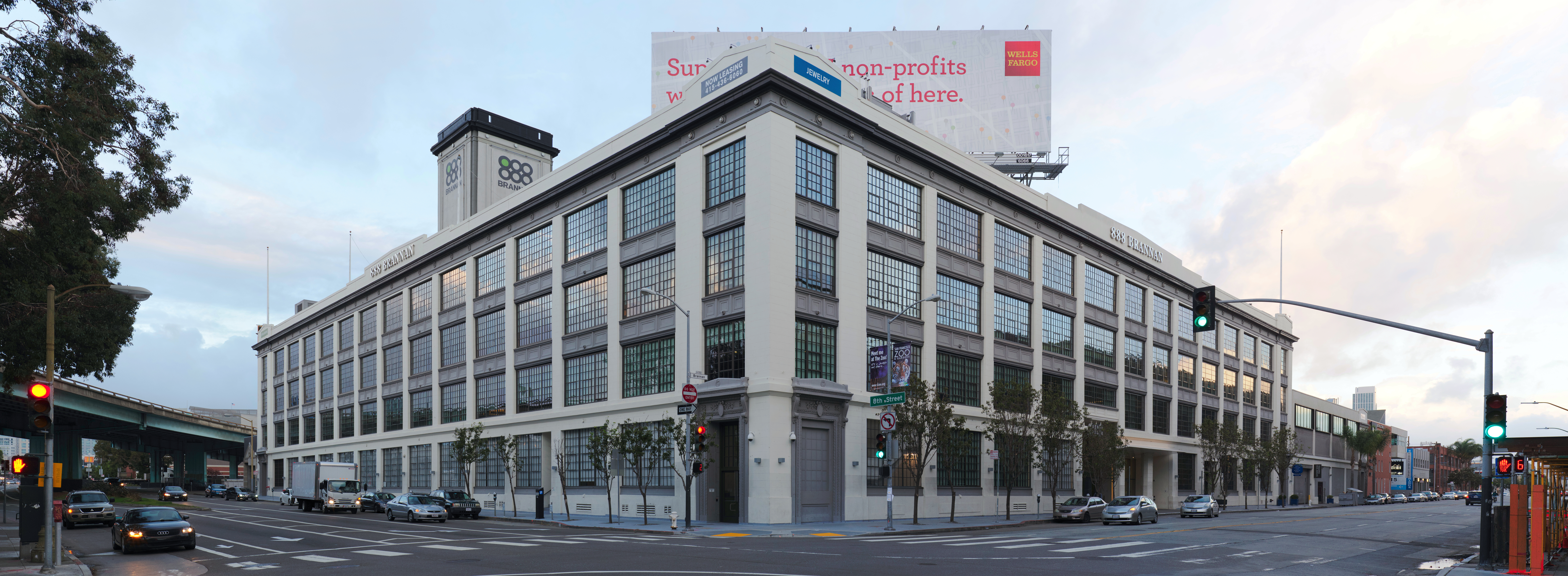
- Headquarters at 888 Brannan Street
- Type: Public
- Traded as: Nasdaq: ABNB (Class A); Nasdaq-100 component; S&P 500 component
- Industry: Lodging
- Founded: August 2008; 18 years ago in San Francisco, California, U.S.
- Founders: Brian Chesky; Joe Gebbia; Nathan Blecharczyk
- Headquarters: San Francisco, California, U.S.
- Area served: Worldwide
- Key people: Brian Chesky (CEO); Nathan Blecharczyk (CSO)
- Services: Lodging; Hospitality; Homestay
- Revenue: ▲US$12.2 billion (2025)
- Operating income: ▼US$2.54 billion (2025)
- Net income: ▼US$2.51 billion (2025)
- Total assets: ▲US$22.2 billion (2025)
- Total equity: ▼US$8.20 billion (2025)
- Owner: Brian Chesky (10.7% economic; 31.9% voting); Nathan Blecharczyk (9.9% economic; 31.1% voting); Joe Gebbia (5.6% economic; 17.6% voting)
- Number of employees: 8,200 (2025)
- Subsidiaries: Luxury Retreats International Inc.; Tilt.com; Accomable; Aibiying; Trooly, Inc.; Deco Software Inc.; Trip4real Experiences, S.L.; Larson8, Inc.; MarketLog, Randorphire Inc.; HotelTonight
- Website: airbnb.com

Airbnb, Inc. (/ˌɛərbiːɛnˈbiː/ AIR-bee-en-BEE, an abbreviation of its original name, "Airbed and Breakfast") is an American company operating an online marketplace for short-and-long-term homestays, experiences and services in various countries and regions. It acts as a broker and charges a commission from each booking. Airbnb was founded in 2008 by Brian Chesky, Nathan Blecharczyk, and Joe Gebbia.

== History ==
In October 2007, in San Francisco, California, to help fund their rent payments, roommates and former schoolmates Brian Chesky and Joe Gebbia came up with an idea of putting an air mattress in their living room and turning it into a bed and breakfast during a conference held by the Industrial Designers Society of America, when travelers had a hard time finding lodging in the city. After the idea was very successful, the pair realized that they had a possible business idea. In February 2008, Nathan Blecharczyk, Chesky's former roommate, joined as the chief technology officer and the third co-founder of the new venture, which they named "AirBed & Breakfast". They put together a website that offered short-term living quarters and breakfast for those who were unable to book a hotel in the saturated market. The site Airbedandbreakfast.com was launched on August 11, 2008.

After the founders raised $30,000 by selling cereal named after the two candidates of the 2008 United States presidential election, Barack Obama and John McCain, mostly at the 2008 Democratic National Convention, computer programmer Paul Graham invited the founders to the January 2009 winter training session of his startup incubator, Y Combinator, which provided them with training and $20,000 in funding in exchange for a 6% interest in the company. With the website already built, they used the Y Combinator investment to fly to New York to meet users and promote the site. They returned to San Francisco with a profitable business model to present to West Coast investors. By March 2009, the site had 10,000 users and 2,500 listings.

In March 2009, the name of the company was shortened to Airbnb.com to eliminate confusion over air mattresses. At the March 2011 South by Southwest conference, Airbnb won the "app" award. In July 2014, Airbnb revealed design revisions to the site and mobile app and introduced a new logo. It also announced a partnership with Concur, an expense reporting service for businesses.

In 2014, linguist Mark Liberman criticized the extreme length of the legal agreements that Airbnb members are required to accept, with the site's terms of service, privacy policy, and other policies amounting to "55081 words, or about the size of a short novel, though much less readable".

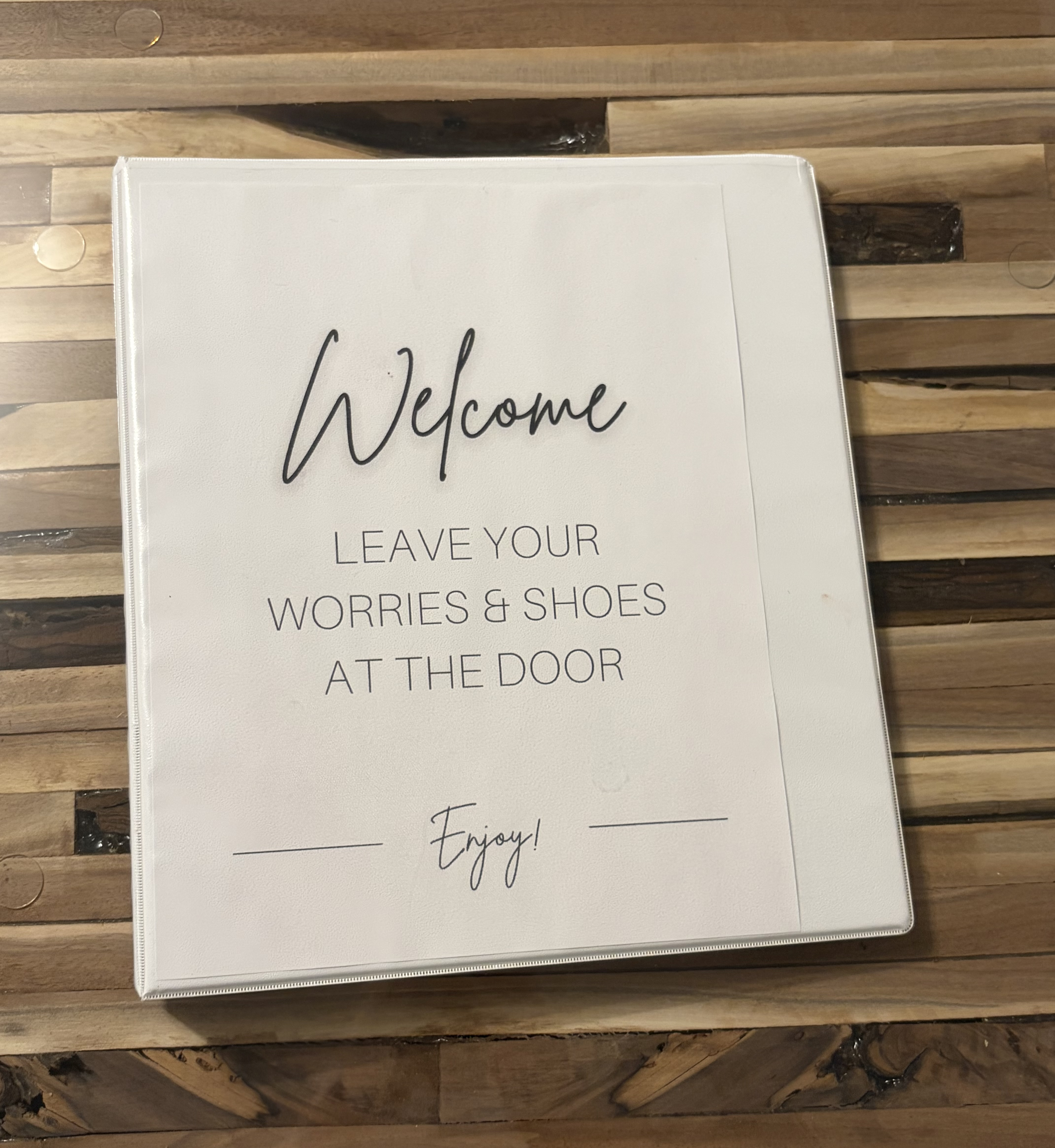
Instructions and rulebook at an Airbnb in Sterling, KS

In April 2015, following the easing of restrictions on U.S. businesses to operate in Cuba, Airbnb expanded to Cuba, making it one of the first U.S. companies to do so. In July 2016, former attorney general Eric Holder was hired to help craft an anti-discrimination policy for Airbnb after reports showed that hosts were refusing to accept lodging requests from guests whose names suggested that they were black. As part of the reform, photos of prospective guests are hidden from hosts until requests for lodging are accepted.

In November 2016, Airbnb launched "experiences", whereby users can use the platform to book activities. In January 2017, along with serial entrepreneurs Gary Vaynerchuk, Ben Leventhal and Mike Montero, Airbnb led a $13 million investment in Resy, a restaurant reservation-booking app. In May 2017, the company launched Airbnbmag, a magazine co-published with Hearst Communications.

In August 2017, Airbnb cancelled numerous bookings, and closed accounts belonging to attendees of the white supremacist Unite the Right rally organized by Jason Kessler in Charlottesville, Virginia, citing its terms of service in which members must "accept people regardless of their race, religion, national origin, ethnicity, disability, sex, gender identity, sexual orientation, or age."

In February 2018, the company announced Airbnb Plus, a collection of homes vetted for quality of services, comfort and design, as well as Beyond by Airbnb, which offers luxury vacation rentals. By October 2019, two million people were staying with Airbnb each night. In April 2019, Airbnb produced and financed Gay Chorus Deep South, a documentary launched by its Rausch Street Films division. The rights were sold to MTV, which aired the program on its network.

During the COVID-19 pandemic, bookings dropped as much as 96% in some cities. However, bookings rose in many rural areas. The company pledged $250 million in payouts to hosts to compensate them for guest cancellations due to the pandemic. The company also laid off approximately 1,900 employees, or about 25% of its workforce in the Americas, Europe, and Asia due to the pandemic. On December 10, 2020, Airbnb became a public company via an initial public offering, raising $3.5 billion on Nasdaq. Shares valued at $238 million were offered to hosts on the platform at the price of $68 per share.

Airbnb was one of the 15 leading sponsors of the 2022 Winter Olympics, held in Beijing, and was asked by human rights activists and groups to drop its sponsorship in March 2021 as part of diplomatic and activist boycotts over alleged human rights violations by the Chinese Communist Party, in particular the persecution of Uyghurs in China. These requests were ignored by the company.

In March 2022, Airbnb suspended business in Russia and Belarus due to international sanctions during the Russian invasion of Ukraine.

In May 2022, Airbnb ceased operations in China because of complicated and expensive laws and regulations that required Airbnb to send detailed information on guests to the government of China, which can be used to track people, as well as a decline in business due to COVID-19 lockdowns; China represented less than 1% of revenue for Airbnb. Airbnb was accused of being too willing to provide information to Chinese authorities, which led to the resignation of an Airbnb executive, who was also a former deputy director of the Federal Bureau of Investigation, in 2019 after 6 months of working. Airbnb had also been accused of allowing listings on land owned by the Xinjiang Production and Construction Corps, a Chinese state-owned paramilitary entity sanctioned under the Magnitsky Act for involvement in the persecution of Uyghurs in China. In 2019, critics accused some hosts in China of discrimination over their refusal to rent to Uyghurs.

After temporarily banning parties in homes rented on the platform in August 2020 due to the COVID-19 pandemic, in June 2022, Airbnb announced that it would permanently ban parties and events in homes on its platform, a position supported by hosts and their neighbors who complained of nuisances at Airbnb properties. In August 2022, Airbnb rolled out technology to enforce this ban.

In January 2021, Airbnb allowed participants in the January 6 United States Capitol attack to book units on the platform in the Washington metropolitan area, despite most hotels in the vicinity of Capitol Hill banning far-right extremists. After the possibility of further violence during the Inauguration of Joe Biden, Airbnb announced the day after the January 6 United States Capitol attack that it was banning all bookings in the region prior to the inauguration.

In February 2025, Airbnb cofounder and board member Joe Gebbia joined the Department of Government Efficiency (DOGE). Concern that Gebbia's work for DOGE undermines U.S. democracy resulted in calls to boycott Airbnb.

In May 2025, Airbnb expanded beyond home rentals by launching Airbnb Services and a redesigned Airbnb Experiences platform. The new services allowed users to book offerings such as chefs, massages, personal training, hair and makeup, and photography through Airbnb. In October 2026, Airbnb introduced rules preventing hosts from requiring time-consuming chores, such as stripping beds or doing laundry, before checkout. Guests can still be asked to put dishes in the sink or sort recycling. The rules apply to bookings made from November 20, 2026, and repeated violations could affect a host's listing.

In June 2025, Airbnb became a sponsor of the FIFA Club World Cup in a three-year partnership to offer "official fan accommodation" at the 2026 FIFA World Cup, which the US is co-hosting with Canada and Mexico, and the 2027 FIFA Women's World Cup in Brazil.

=== Acquisitions ===
#	Date	Company	Notes	Ref.
1	May 2011	Accoleo	German competitor; launched the first international Airbnb office, in Hamburg	
2	March 2012	CrashPadder	Added 6,000 international listings to its existing inventory; made Airbnb the largest lodging website in the United Kingdom.	
3	November 2012	NabeWise	Online city guide that aggregates curated information for specified locations; shifted the company's focus toward offering hyperlocal recommendations to travelers	
4	December 2012	Localmind	A location-based question and answer platform	
5	September 2015	Vamo	Immediately shut down the company, acquiring its employees	
6	September 2015	Lapka	Sensor startup	
7	September 2016	Trip4real	Travel activities marketplace	
8	February 2017	Luxury Retreats International	Canadian-based villa rental company; price was $300 million in cash and stock	
9	February 2017	Tilt.com	A social payment startup	
10	November 2017	Accomable	Startup focused on travel accessibility	
11	November 2017	AdBasis	Advertising technology platform built for A/B testing and multivariate ad testing	
12	January 2019	Gaest	Based in Aarhus, Denmark; provides a platform for posting and booking venues for meetings and other events	
13	March 2019	HotelTonight	Website for booking last-minute hotel rooms; price was $400 million	
14	August 2019	Urbandoor	Global online marketplace that offers extended stays to corporate clients	
15	November 2023	GamePlanner.AI	AI startup	

=== Corporate office history ===
In October 2011, Airbnb established an office in London, its first international office. In early 2012, Airbnb opened offices in Paris, Milan, Barcelona, Copenhagen, Moscow, and São Paulo. These openings were in addition to existing offices in San Francisco, London, Hamburg, and Berlin. In September 2013, the company announced that it would establish its European headquarters in Dublin.

In November 2012, Airbnb opened an office in Sydney, its 11th office location, and announced plans to launch the service in Thailand and Indonesia. In December 2012, Airbnb opened an office in Singapore. In April 2022, Airbnb instituted a policy of unlimited remote working for almost all its employees.

=== Share sales, corporate borrowing and valuation history ===
In April 2009, the company received $600,000 in seed money from Sequoia Capital, with Youniversity Ventures partners Jawed Karim, Keith Rabois, and Kevin Hartz participating. Shares were sold for $0.01 each. In November 2010, Greylock Partners and Sequoia Capital invested $7.2 million in a Series A round. Shares were sold for $0.21 each (split adjusted). In July 2011, Andreessen Horowitz, Digital Sky Technologies, General Catalyst, and A Grade Investments partners Ashton Kutcher and Guy Oseary invested $112 million in the company. Shares were sold for $3.21 each (split adjusted). In April 2014, TPG Capital invested $450 million in the company at a valuation of $10 billion. Additional funding was provided by Andreessen Horowitz, Sequoia Capital, Dragoneer Investment Group, T. Rowe Price, and Sherpa Capital. Shares in this round were sold for $20.36 each (split adjusted).

In June 2015, General Atlantic, Hillhouse Capital Group, Tiger Management, Kleiner Perkins Caufield & Byers, GGV Capital, China Broadband Capital, and Horizons Ventures invested $1.5 billion in the company. Shares in this round were sold for $46.55 each (split adjusted).

In September 2016, Google Capital and Technology Crossover Ventures invested $555.5 million in the company at a valuation of $30 billion. Shares in this round were sold for $52.50 each (split adjusted). In March 2017, Airbnb raised $1 billion in funding, bringing total funding raised to more than $3 billion and valuing the company at $31 billion. Shares in this round were sold for $52.50 each (split adjusted). In April 2020, Silver Lake and Sixth Street Partners acquired $1 billion in shares in the company at an $18 billion valuation and $1 billion in debt at interest rates of 9%–11.5%.

== Regulations ==
Regulations have been imposed on short-term rental platforms after proponents argued that short-term rental has reduced affordable housing and contributed to the increase of long-term rental prices due to changes in housing supply and demand; short-term rentals can be more lucrative than long-term rentals for landlords and also attract investors who bid up housing prices. Supporters of short-term rentals argue that the impact on housing prices has been minimal and that the way to increase affordable housing is to increase the housing supply. Examples include Lisbon, where a moratorium on short-term rentals did not reduce housing costs; it only increased hotel prices.

In rare cases, landlords have been accused of illegally evicting tenants to convert properties into short-term rentals to obtain higher rents.

The hotel industry has lobbied for additional regulations on short-term rentals, which compete with hotels. Short-term rental platforms also use lobbying to promote their interests.

In addition to government-imposed restrictions, many homeowner associations also limit short-term rentals. Neighborhood community groups have voiced concern that short-term residents can cause issues with congestion, noise, and safety.

Regulation of short-term rentals can include requirements for hosts to have business licenses, payment of hotel taxes, limitations on the number of days that a space is rented, requirements for hosts to occupy the space, and compliance with building, city and zoning standards.

=== Regulations by jurisdiction ===
==== Europe ====
- Amsterdam: Hosts can rent their properties for up to 30 nights per year to a group of no more than four at a time. Short-term rentals are banned in certain areas.
- Barcelona: Licenses and higher property taxes are required. All short-term rentals will be banned in November 2028.
- Berlin: Licenses are required. Hosts must live in most of the property.
- Budapest: Licenses and taxation are required; short-term rentals are banned in certain areas.
- Ireland: Licenses are required. Short-term rentals are restricted to a maximum of 90 days per year for primary residences.
- Lisbon: Licenses are required. Short-term rentals are limited to 10% of the housing stock.
- London: Short-term rentals are limited to 90 days per year.
- Lucerne: Short-term rentals are limited to 90 days per year.
- Madrid: Listings without private entrances are banned.
- Palma de Mallorca: Short-term rentals are banned.
- Paris: Hosts can rent their homes for no more than 120 days per year. Licenses are required.
- Rome: Short-term rental sites are required to withhold a 21% rental income tax.
- Venice: Hosts must collect and remit tourist taxes.
- Vienna: Short-term rentals are banned in specific "residential zones" within the city, with the exemption of apartments occupied by the host.

==== United States ====
- Boston, Massachusetts: Short-term rentals are only allowed in owner-occupied condominiums, single-family, two-family, and three-family buildings. Registration is required.
- Chicago, Illinois: Licenses are required. Single-night stays are prohibited.
- Jersey City, New Jersey: Hosts are only allowed to rent for 60 days per year.
- Las Vegas, Nevada: Owners must occupy the property; must be away from casinos, licenses are required, limited to 1% of housing stock.
- Los Angeles, California: Hosts must register with the city planning department and pay an $89 fee and cannot home-share for more than 120 days in a calendar year.
- Miami, Florida: Short-term rentals are banned in most neighborhoods, in part due to lobbying efforts of the hotel industry.
- New York City, New York: Licenses are required. Rentals under 30 days are prohibited unless the host is present on the property.
- Phoenix, Arizona: Most regulations are not allowed since municipalities are prohibited from interfering in property rights.
- Portland, Oregon: The number of bedrooms in a single unit that may be listed is limited.
- San Diego, California: Units for short-term rental are limited to 1% of the housing stock and licenses are required.
- San Francisco, California: Registration by hosts is required.
- Santa Cruz, California: Local Board of supervisors discussed parking restrictions in the areas where there are many short-term rentals, in order to discourage people from staying there, and prioritize the local residents' ability to park.
- Santa Monica, California: Licenses are required. Hosts are prohibited from listing multiple properties.
- Seattle, Washington: Licenses are required. Hosts cannot rent more than two units.
- Washington, D.C.: Licenses are required. If the host does not live on the property, rentals are limited to 90 days each year.
- Weehawken, New Jersey: Short-term rentals under 30 days are banned.
- West New York, New Jersey: Short-term rentals under 30 days are banned.

==== Canada ====
- Montreal: Short-term rentals must be in a host's primary residence. Only allowed between June 10 and September 10. Prohibited in certain districts.
- Toronto: Licenses are required. Short-term rentals must be in a host's primary residence. Taxes are required.
- Vancouver: Licenses are required; cost C$1,108/year. Short-term rentals must be in a host's primary residence.

==== Asia ====
- Japan: Licenses are required; a home can be rented for a maximum of 180 days per year.
- Singapore: Short-term home rentals of less than three months for private properties or less than six months for Housing and Development Board flats are illegal.
- Taiwan: Short-term rentals require approval, a hotel business license, and must pass safety inspections and provide public accident insurance; many short-term rentals are illegal.

==== South America ====
- Brazil: Under the Brazilian Tenancy Law, a residential property may be rented for temporary purposes for a period not exceeding 90 days, whether or not it is furnished. In May 2026, the Superior Court of Justice ruled that the use of units in residential condominiums for short stays offered through digital platforms requires a change in the designated use of the property approved by at least two-thirds of the condominium owners. Short- and medium-term furnished rentals are also offered by Brazilian services such as Shortstay, which provides furnished apartments with flexible rental periods and digital contracts.

== Corporate affairs ==
=== Finances ===
The key trends for Airbnb are (as at the financial year ending December 31):

Year	Revenue (US$ bn)	Net income (US$ m)	Total assets (US$ bn)	Employees	Sources
2014	0.4				
2015	0.9				
2016	1.7				
2017	2.6	−70.5	6.0		
2018	3.6	−16.8	6.6		
2019	4.8	−674	8.3	5,465	
2020	3.3	−4,584	10.4	5,597	
2021	5.9	−352	13.7	6,132	
2022	8.3	1,893	16.0	6,811	
2023	9.9	4,800	20.6	6,907	
2024	11.1	2,650	20.9	7,300	
2025	12.2	2,516	22.2	8,200	

==== Sales by market ====
2025 revenue by geographic region:

Region	Revenue (US$ bn)	Share
North America	5.2	42.45%
Europe, the Middle East and Africa	4.73	38.63%
Asia-Pacific	1.16	9.48%
Latin America	1.16	9.4%
Total	12.24	100%

=== Board of Directors ===
From Airbnb's governance section, the following individuals serve on the Board of Directors in 2025:

- Brian Chesky, Co‑founder, CEO & Chairman of the Board
- Angela Ahrendts, Independent director and former head of Apple's retail division
- Amrita Ahuja, Chief Financial Officer and Chief Operating Officer of Block
- Nathan Blecharczyk, Co‑founder & Chief Strategy Officer
- Kenneth Chenault, Independent director and former CEO of American Express.
- Ellie Mertz, Independent director and Airbnb's CFO.
- Joe Gebbia, Co‑founder
- Jeff (Jeffrey) Jordan, Independent director and former CEO of OpenTable
- Alfred Lin, Independent director and former COO of Zappos
- James Manyika, Independent director and Senior Partner at McKinsey.

== Other notable attributes ==
Airbnb does not have a loyalty program, in part attributed to its lack of business customers.

Airbnb features a review system in which guests and hosts can rate and review each other after a stay; reviews are not visible until both host and guest have submitted reviews or until the time period to review has closed, a system that aims to improve accuracy and objectivity by removing fears that users will receive a negative review in retaliation if they write one. However, the truthfulness and impartiality of reviews may be adversely affected by concerns that the reviews are not anonymous and prospective hosts may refuse to host a user who generally leaves negative reviews.

=== Philanthropy ===
Through Airbnb.org, the company facilitates and provides free and discounted stays to people impacted by emergencies such as natural disasters, the COVID-19 pandemic, and the Russo-Ukrainian war in partnership with the International Organization for Migration. It was founded in 2012 with $6 million and 400,000 shares of Airbnb stock from the co-founders of Airbnb.

== Legal issues ==
=== Lawsuits after incidents at properties ===
In very rare cases, Airbnb has been sued for safety issues that have occurred at properties rented via the platform including murder, sexual assault, drowning, and extortion by hosts. Airbnb argues it is merely an intermediary; however, victims have successfully sued for negligence when the company was aware of dangerous conditions and failed to act, or due to host liability. Airbnb has noted that its background checks should not be relied on to identify "all past criminal convictions or sex offender registrations ... or other red flags" and that convictions for "murder, terrorism, rape or child molestation" are not automatic disqualifiers for a host.

In 2021, the company paid $7 million to an Australian guest who was raped at knifepoint in New York City on New Year's Eve 2015 at a property rented via the platform.

While all indoor cameras are prohibited on properties listed on Airbnb, even if disclosed, a report by CNN noted that the company "consistently fails to protect its guests despite knowing hidden cameras are a persistent concern within its industry" and Airbnb has been sued several times after guests found hidden cameras in properties rented via the platform.

=== Complicity with price gouging ===
A lawsuit was filed in July 2025 against Airbnb alleging that it was complicit in price gouging by hosts after the 2025 California wildfires. The lawsuit is still in its early stages.

=== Failure to provide required information to governments ===
Airbnb has been sued by governments for failure to turn over required information for enforcement of laws related to illegal rentals and collection of hotel tax. These include disputes with New York City, Boston, Miami, and Belgium.

=== Legality of service fees in the Netherlands ===
In March 2020, a subdistrict court ruling in the Netherlands found that Airbnb charging service fees to both the host and the guest was illegal and that the 30,000 people who had rented as guests have a right for reimbursement if they file claims. Airbnb filed countersuits in an attempt to gain clarity on the ruling.

=== Weak policy against hate groups ===
In May 2024, a former Airbnb contractor alleged in a whistleblower complaint filed with the US Securities and Exchange Commission and Federal Trade Commission that the company had weakened its policies against extremists and members of hate groups and dissolved its team that handled removing them from the platform. Airbnb denied the allegations. Examples include the reversal of the decision to remove the parents of Canadian far-right activist Lauren Southern from its platform after complaints by conservative media outlets.

=== Proposed removal of listings in Israeli settlements ===
In November 2018, Airbnb announced that it would remove the approximately 200 "listings in Israeli settlements in the occupied West Bank that are at the core of the dispute between Israelis and Palestinians". However, after affected property owners filed lawsuits against Airbnb in both Israel and the United States alleging discrimination based on place of residence, in April 2019, the company reversed its plans to remove listings in the West Bank and instead promised to donate any profits from these listings to non-profit organizations dedicated to humanitarian aid.

On February 12, 2020, Airbnb was included on a list of companies operating in West Bank settlements involved in activities that "raised particular human rights concerns" published by the United Nations Human Rights Council. The company was categorized under "the provision of services and utilities supporting the maintenance and existence of settlements".

=== Attempts to appropriate "bnb" as a brand ===
Airbnb has engaged in legal actions against small bed and breakfast businesses for their use of the term "bnb", on grounds of brand infringement.

== See also ==
- Booking.com
- Hotels.com
- KAYAK
