= Engineering Campus (University of Illinois Urbana-Champaign) =

Region within a university campus

Coordinates: 40°06′42″N 88°13′37″W

The Engineering Campus is the colloquial name for the portions of campus surrounding the Bardeen Quadrangle and the Beckman Quadrangle at the College of Engineering at the University of Illinois Urbana–Champaign. It is an area of approximately 30 square blocks, roughly bounded by Green Street on the south, Wright Street on the west, University Avenue on the north, and Gregory Street on the east.

== Bardeen Quadrangle ==
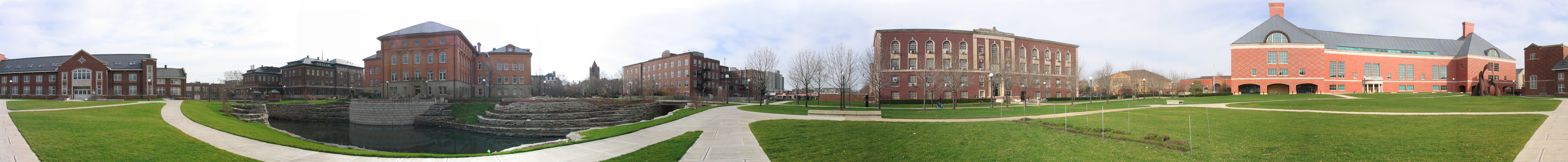
Panorama of the Bardeen Quad (left to right: MEL, MSEB, Engineering Hall, Everitt Lab, Talbot Lab, Grainger Library

The Bardeen Quadrangle, named for John Bardeen, is the central part of the Engineering Campus and home to most of the undergraduate facilities. As such, it is often known as the Engineering Quadrangle. The Boneyard Creek runs through the middle of the quad.

Starting at Engineering Hall going clockwise:

=== Engineering Hall ===
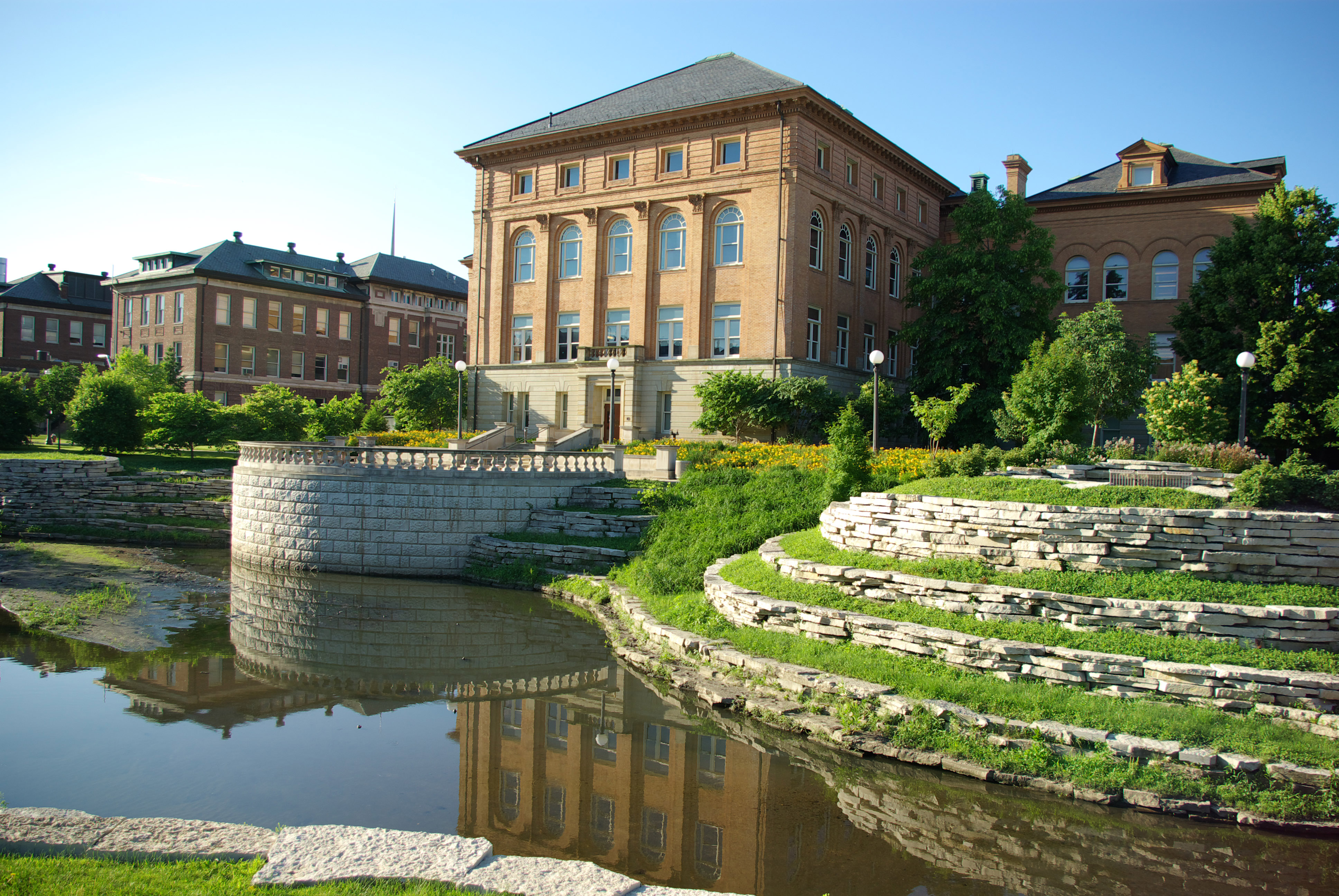
Engineering Hall

Engineering Hall is the administrative center for the College of Engineering and prominently faces the Illini Union across Green Street. In addition to dozens of administrative offices and conference rooms, there are numerous classrooms and a pair of computer labs for student use. Many engineering-related student organizations are based in Engineering Hall as well, including the professional societies such as Engineering Council, SHPE, and others. The rear side of Engineering Hall includes a veranda overlooking the Boneyard Creek toward Grainger Library. Engineering Hall is the only building on campus to fully sport university colors with its recognizable orange brickwork.

=== Everitt Laboratory ===
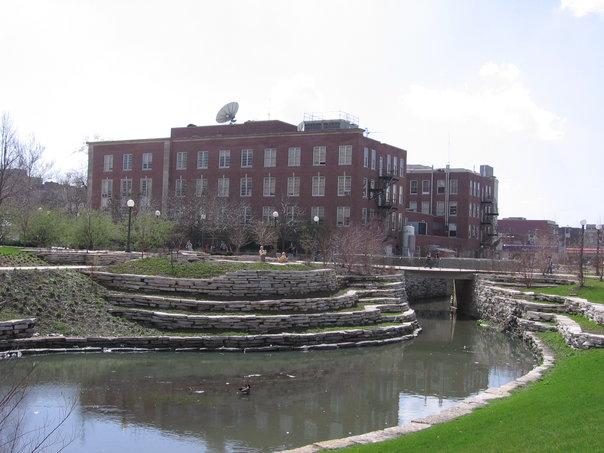
Everitt Lab

Everitt Lab was the former home of the Department of Electrical and Computer Engineering. The building is named after the ECE professor William L. Everitt. The fourth floor contains communications and silicon-chip manufacturing labs, and the Integrated Circuits Fabrication Lab is located in the lower levels. As the Department of Electrical and Computer Engineering moved to the newly constructed Electrical and Computer Engineering Building in the summer of 2014, Everitt Lab is now being used as home of the Department of Bioengineering and additional engineering classroom space.

=== Talbot Laboratory ===
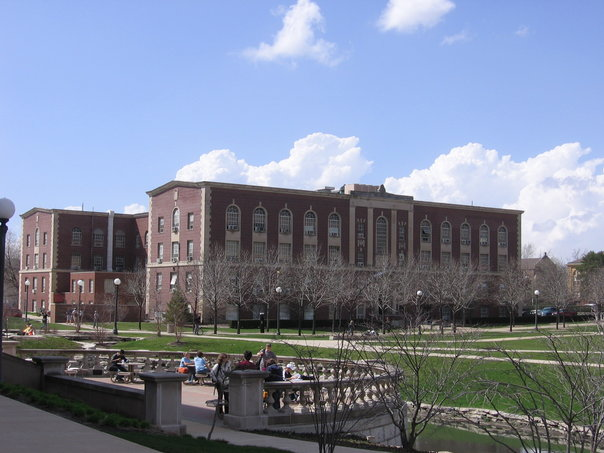
Talbot Lab

Named for Arthur Newell Talbot, Talbot Laboratory holds classrooms and small lecture halls, as well as extensive structural mechanics and fluid mechanics laboratory equipment. The second floor houses the Nuclear, Plasma, and Radiological Engineering department, while the third floor is used for the Aerospace Engineering department, and includes offices for most of the Aerospace faculty as well as the McDonnell Douglas Computer Lab (commonly known as the "AeroLab"), a formerly windowless cell for Aerospace students to gather and collectively work and study. In January 2012, the west-facing side of the AeroLab was expanded to include windows that give students a view of Campustown and downtown Champaign in the distance.

Talbot Laboratory is known for containing one of largest tension and compression testing machines in the nation. The machine can apply 3 million pounds of force of either tension or compression, and can be rented out to outside companies for testing.

=== Campus Instructional Facility ===
The Campus Instructional Facility (CIF) is a 5-floor building that contains classrooms and small lectures halls for general use. Construction began in the summer of 2019, and the building was opened in the fall of 2021.

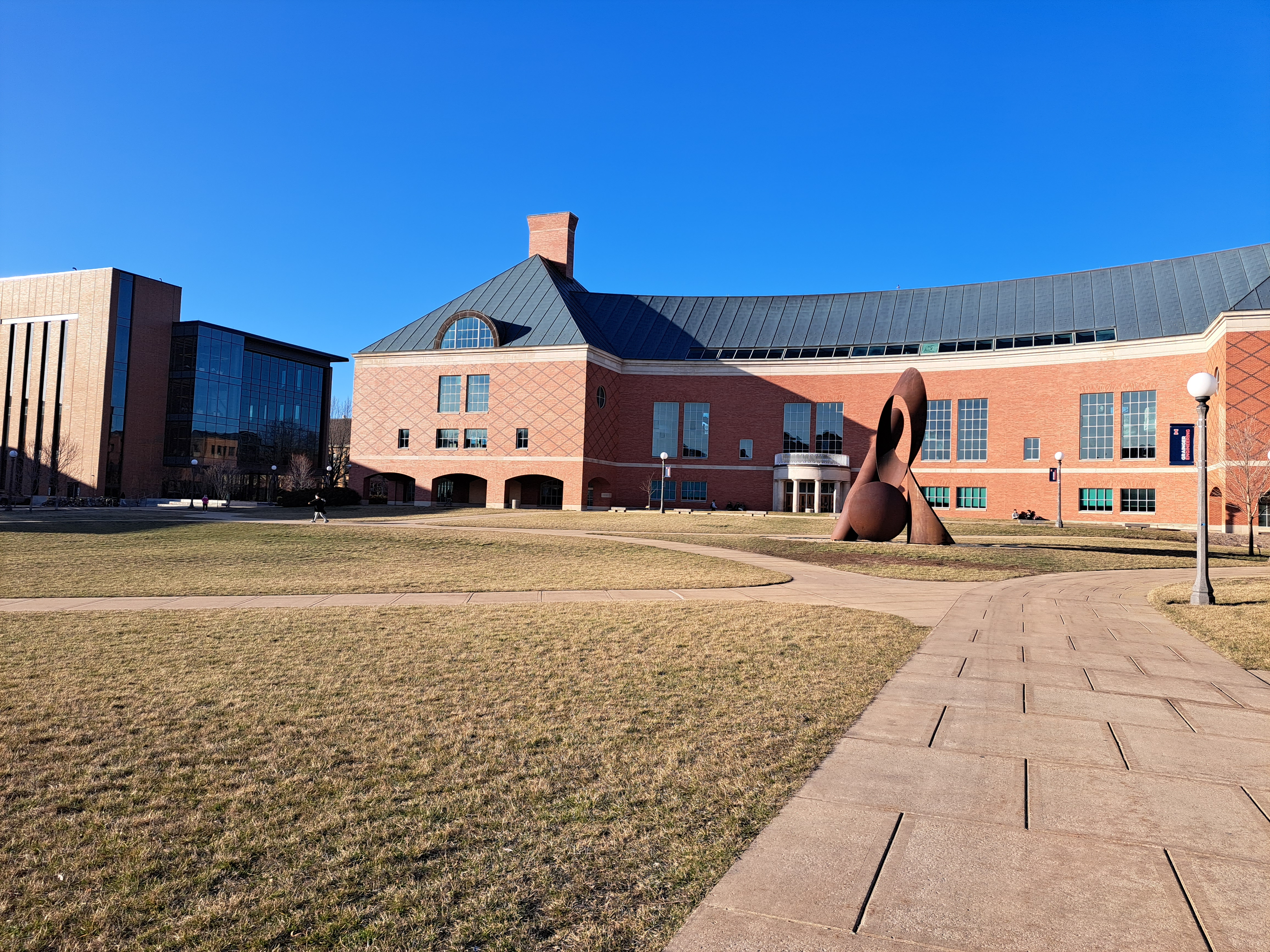
Campus Instructional Facility (left) and Grainger Library (right) in 2023

=== Mechanical Engineering Laboratory ===
The Mechanical Engineering Lab (MEL) is one of the buildings used by the Department of Mechanical Science and Engineering. The building was renovated in 2002 and contains the John Deere Pavilion, the Ford Design and Manufacturing Lab, McGinnis Studios, and Rosenthal Galleries.

=== Materials Science and Engineering Building ===
The Materials Science and Engineering Building (MSEB) is home to the Department of Materials Science and Engineering. This building has been named a National Historic Physics Site by the American Physical Society.

== Beckman Quadrangle ==
The Beckman Quadrangle is north of Springfield Avenue from the Bardeen Quad and is home to numerous undergraduate facilities as well as graduate facilities. The quad gets its name from Beckman Institute for Advanced Science and Technology, which towers over the quad at its northernmost point.

=== Electrical and Computer Engineering Building ===
The Electrical and Computer Engineering Building (ECEB) is the new home of the Department of Electrical and Computer Engineering started August 2014. Plans were in place in 2008 to move the ECE department from Everitt Laboratory to a new building as class sizes grew and bigger demands were placed on research space and lab classes. Construction started in January 2012 and the building was opened with the ceremony in October 2014. The new ECE building is the largest building in the world to have a net-zero energy design with 230,000 square feet of labs, classrooms, and facilities, including a nanofabrication lab.

=== Hydrosystems Laboratory ===
The Ven Te Chow Hydrosystems Laboratory is home of the Environmental Hydrology and Hydraulic Engineering group of the Department of Civil and Environmental Engineering. It is named after Dr. Ven Te Chow. It houses an 11,000 sq ft (1,000 m^{2}) research laboratory complete with, among others, flumes, a rainfall generator, and a hydraulic model of the Chicago River.

=== Digital Computer Laboratory ===
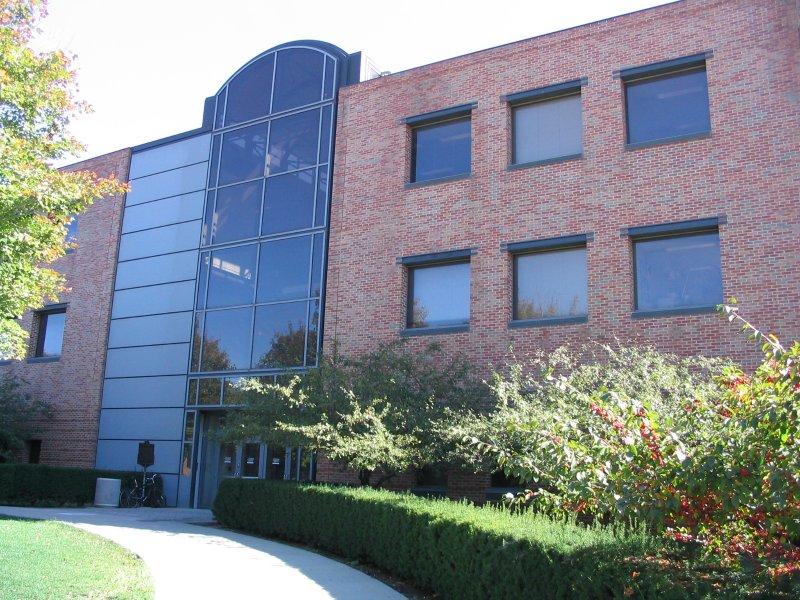
Digital Computer Laboratory

The Digital Computer Laboratory (DCL) was the original home of the Computer Science department. The two-story building was constructed in 1958 at what was then the corner of Romine and Stoughton Streets, and was expanded in 1967. The original building contained ILLIAC I, one of the first supercomputers. In 1989, another addition added a third floor and enclosed the old building on three sides, and the building was re-addressed according to the location of its new main entrances near Springfield Avenue (the original building walls can still be seen from the inside). In 2004, the Computer Science department offices moved to the Siebel Center upon its completion, and most of the office space in DCL is now occupied by Technology Services at Illinois, the campus's central IT department, which had previously shared the building with Computer Science. The DCL is also the home to the Engineering Career Services and was also the former home to the Department of Bioengineering.

=== Kenney Gym ===
Kenney Gym is a gymnasium on the corner of Springfield Avenue and Wright Street with a large selection of athletic equipment. It was home to the basketball team until the construction the Huff Hall and is currently used by the gymnastics team.

=== Holonyak Micro and Nanotechnology Laboratory ===
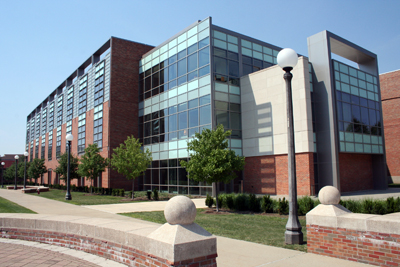
Micro and Nanotechnology Laboratory

The Micro and Nanotechnology Laboratory is used primarily for research in the field of nanotechnology and has recently undergone a major renovation to greatly expand its facilities. The laboratory now has over 8,000 square feet of clean rooms for research purposes.

=== Newmark Civil Engineering Laboratory ===
Named for Nathan M. Newmark, this lab is home to the Department of Civil and Environmental Engineering.

== Other buildings ==
Separate from the two quads are numerous additional buildings that are affiliated with the College of Engineering.

=== Siebel Center for Computer Science ===
The Siebel Center is home to the Department of Computer Science. Officially opened on April 29, 2004, the Siebel Center began with the initial contribution of $32 million to the University by alumnus and successful technology entrepreneur Thomas Siebel in 1999. The project's final cost came to roughly $80 million, with more than half ($48 million) having been paid for by the state of Illinois.

The Siebel Center houses the Department of Computer Science, which currently shares the distinction of being one of the top five Computer Science departments in the nation with Stanford University, the University of California, Berkeley, Carnegie Mellon University, and the Massachusetts Institute of Technology. The center has over 225,000 square feet (21,000 m²) of research, office, and laboratory space, an undergraduate population of 900, over 450 graduate students, and 100 faculty and research members. The Siebel Center claims to be the first "Computing Habitat", featuring a fully interactive environment and intelligent building system. The facility is equipped with computer-controlled locks, proximity and location sensors, cameras to track room activity, and other sensory and control features.

=== Transportation Building ===
The Transportation Building is home to the Department of Industrial and Enterprise Systems Engineering.

=== Mechanical Engineering Building ===
The Mechanical Engineering Building (MEB) is one of the buildings used by the Department of Mechanical Science and Engineering.

=== Ceramics Building ===
The Ceramics Building is part of the Department of Materials Science and Engineering. There is a separate kiln building nearby.

=== Nuclear Engineering Laboratory ===
The Nuclear Engineering Laboratory houses classrooms and laboratories, as well as faculty and graduate student offices for the Department of Nuclear, Plasma, and Radiological Engineering

=== Nuclear Radiation Laboratory ===
The Nuclear Radiation Laboratory is used by the Department of Nuclear, Plasma, and Radiological Engineering.

=== Loomis Laboratory of Physics ===
Loomis Lab is home to the Department of Physics. The facility at 1110 W. Green Street in Urbana, IL, is the second building commissioned to house the department. It was constructed during 1958–1959 and dedicated in 1980 to the memory of Francis Wheeler Loomis (1889–1976), who during his tenure as head of department from 1929 until 1957 was instrumental in attracting world-class physicists to Illinois. It was under his leadership that the department established its world-renowned research program in solid state physics (now called condensed matter physics); that program—one of the first of its kind in the nation—today remains at the forefront of the field.

=== Materials Research Laboratory ===
The Illinois Materials Research Laboratory (MRL) is home to several large-scale research programs, including a NSF-funded Materials Research Science and Engineering Center, the Illinois Quantum Information Science and Technology center, the BP-supported International Centre for Advanced Materials, several large DOE-funded efforts, as well as a number of other research activities.

=== Engineering Sciences Building ===
The Engineering Sciences Building (ESB), located at 1101 West Springfield Avenue in Urbana, IL, is home to the Institute for Condensed Matter Theory (ICMT). ESB also is home to a number of individual research groups and other collaborative activities as well as the administrative offices of the Illinois Quantum Information Science and Technology center.

=== Superconductivity Center ===
The Superconductivity Center (SC) is home to the administrative offices of the Illinois Materials Research Laboratory and the Illinois Materials Research Science and Engineering Center. The SC is also home to a number of individual research groups and facilities for materials characterization.
