= Engineering Hall (University of Illinois Urbana-Champaign) =

- Front of Engineering Hall
- Interactive map of the Engineering Hall area

General information
- Location: 1308 West Green Street, Urbana, Illinois, USA
- Coordinates: 40°6′39″N 88°13′37″W
- Current tenants: UIUC College of Engineering (primarily administration)
- Completed: November 15, 1894
- Renovated: 2000
- Cost: $162,278.40 ($6,038,629 in modern terms)
- Owner: University of Illinois

Technical details
- Floor area: 63,800 square feet (5,930 m^{2})

Design and construction
- Architect: George Bullard (U of I 1882)
- Main contractor: Yeager & Schultz

Engineering Hall is an administrative building at the University of Illinois at Urbana–Champaign. It is located in the south end of the Bardeen Quadrangle on Green Street in Urbana, Illinois, facing the Illini Union. Engineering Hall serves all disciplines within the UIUC College of Engineering and is well known for representing the school's colors with its orange bricks and blue roof. In addition to many offices and conference rooms, Engineering Hall also includes two computer labs and four lecture halls. Engineering Hall also houses many engineering-based student organizations in its offices.

== History ==
In early 1893, at the request of Professor Nathan Ricker, the UIUC Board of Trustees asked the State of Illinois for $160,000 to construct a building for its College of Engineering. After the state approved of the grant, the board asked for designs for the new building. However, they accepted designs only from the university's graduate architecture students at the request of its alumni. Fifteen designs were received, and after much deliberation, George Bullard's design was accepted. Bullard was from Tacoma, Washington and was a student of UIUC architect and professor Nathan Ricker, the designer of Altgeld Hall. Bullard graduated from the University of Illinois in 1882. He was later made architect of the building. A general contractor was needed to oversee the construction. Bids were advertised starting on September 11, 1893. The project was awarded to Yeager & Schultz of Danville, IL.

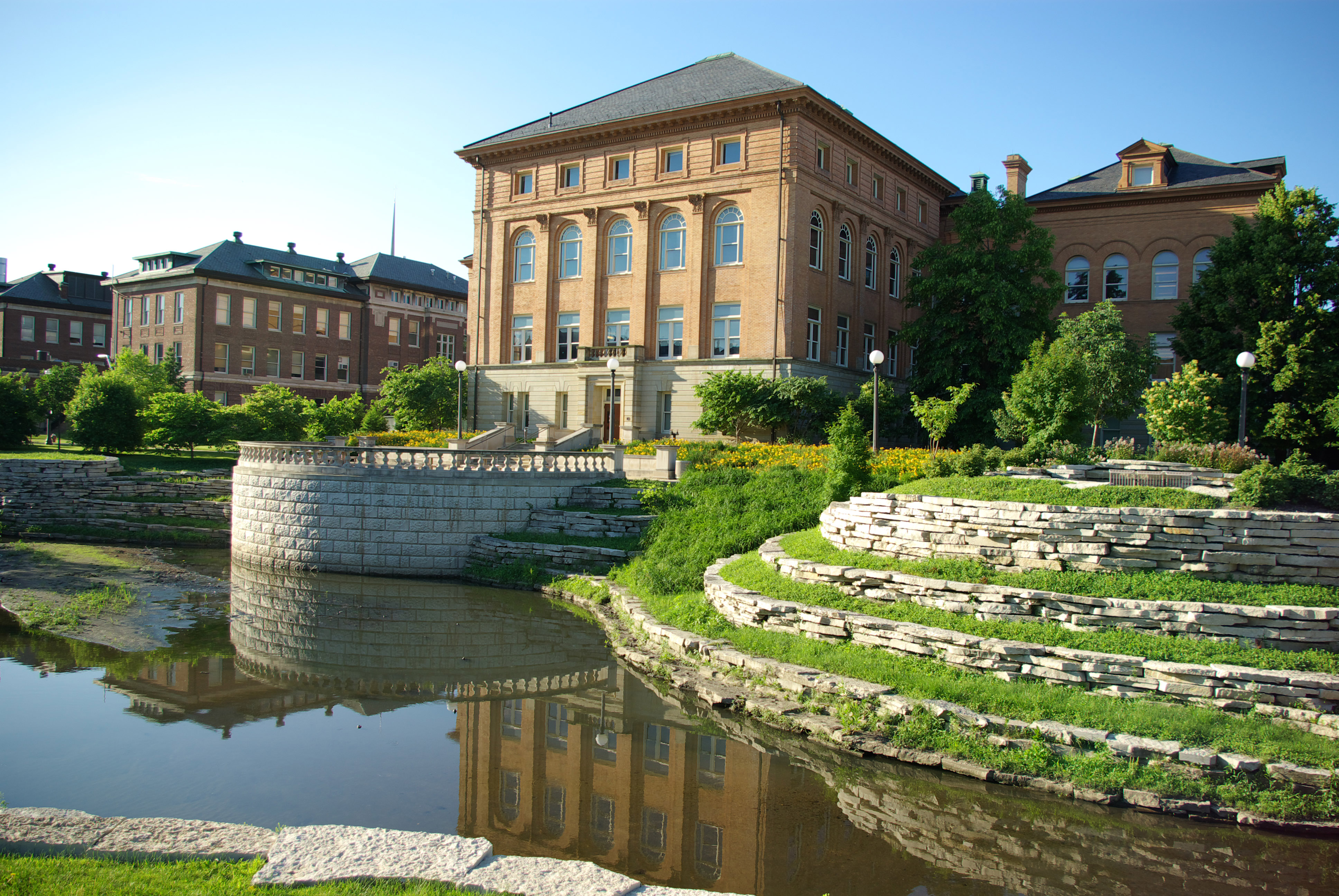
North side of the engineering hall by the boneyard creek

Engineering Hall was completed on November 15, 1894. It was the first University building constructed solely for the use of a single college. The building consisted of orange bricks and its roof was dark blue. In fact, it was the completion of Engineering Hall that led to the adoption of orange and navy blue as the school colors.

== Floorplan ==
=== 1st floor ===
The first floor on Engineering Hall has many small offices for some of the student engineering organizations such as Engineering Council, Engineers Without Borders (EWB), Society of Hispanic Professional Engineers, Tau Beta Pi, the Society of Women Engineers, and the National Society of Black Engineers. There are four small lecture classrooms on the first floor, each seating about 40 people. Lecture rooms may be rented out to student organizations. As of 2008, the Kappa chapter of Theta Tau and the Theta chapter of Alpha Omega Epsilon use these rooms for their general meetings. There are two side entrances on either wing and a rear entrance that opens to the veranda overlooking the Boneyard Creek behind the building. The three sets of doors are locked at night, but UIUC students may enter the building to use the computer lab by swiping their ID on the scanner, which would unlock the doors. The first floor also includes a room with a photocopier and a break room with several vending machines. Just outside its west entrance are bicycle racks, a Tau Beta Pi statue of its insignia, and an open area known as Area 51, which is used to hold many social engineering events.

=== 2nd floor ===
The main entrance is located on the second floor. The second floor houses the offices of the deans of the College of Engineering. The deans and academic advisors are located here to answer questions and provide any other information about Engineering at Illinois. The College of Engineering Store, which sells apparel, gifts, and other merchandise, is located just outside in the hallway. The office of International Programs of Engineering (IPENG) is located on the east wing. There are several conference rooms on this floor as well. The second floor is only open to students during regular hours on the weekdays, unless for some special occasions.

=== 3rd floor ===
This floor has many conference rooms as well as administrative offices. Some social events, such as receptions for UIUC Engineering Alumni, are held here. Like the second floor, this area is off limits to students during the night.

=== 4th floor ===
The fourth floor houses two computer labs, known as Engineering Work Stations (EWS), as well as more administrative offices and conference rooms. These labs are maintained by the custodial staff as well as student lab assistants. The labs are accessible to students all day, however, only students in engineering may log on to the computers. Students must use their student IDs to get into the building at night.

== Computing and technologies ==
As of 2009, each computer lab has 40 Windows computers. Four printers and two scanners are shared among these 80 computers. Only engineering students can use these computers. Students are given a printing quota of 300 units per semester. One black-and-white page costs one unit and one colored page costs four. Print jobs can be sent to EWS labs in other buildings. The labs are maintained by student lab consultants. Instructors may reserve the labs for their classes. The two labs are open for student use 24 hours per day, 7 days per week each semester.

The EWS computers have the most current software used by engineering students. In addition to Microsoft Office, it also includes AutoCAD, Autodesk Inventor, Eclipse, MATLAB, and Iode, an educational software package developed by UIUC professor in mathematics Peter Brinkmann. The computers are updated with the latest software. For example, as of Fall 2009, Autodesk Inventor 2010 has replaced the 2009 version.

== Construction and maintenance ==
Engineering Hall was designed by UIUC graduate student George Bullard. The contractor responsible for the construction was Yeager & Schultz. The 63,800-square-foot (5,930 m^{2}) building cost $162,278.40 to construct and featured an interior richly appointed with oak and a ceiling paneled in Washington fir. The graduating class of 1894 inscribed their class numerals in a stone tablet by the Green Street entrance as a class memorial. The 4-story building was 200 feet (61 m) long and 138 feet (42 m) deep, with twin 76-foot (23 m) wings. Engineering Hall an example of Renaissance Revival architecture.

Engineering hall has undergone several renovations during the twentieth century. Some of these improvements include wireless internet capabilities, air conditioning, sensor-activated hand dryers, improved heating systems, and overhead projectors. In Fall 1998, renovations were made to restore the building to its original stature. On June 12, 1998, the relocation of staff and furnishings from the building were complete. On August 1, 1998, work formally began and the renovation was completed in 2000.

== See also ==
- UIUC College of Engineering
- UIUC Engineering Campus
- Grainger Engineering Library
