= Rashid Bashir =

Pakistani biomedical engineer

- Bashir in 2026

Chancellor-elect of the University of Wisconsin-Madison
- Assuming office February 2027
- Succeeding: Eric Wilcots (a.i.)

Personal details
- Education: Purdue University; Texas Tech University
- Scientific career
- Fields: BioMEMS, biosensors, bionanotechnology, tissue engineering, nanomedicine
- Workplaces: University of Illinois Urbana–Champaign
- Doctoral advisor: Gerold Neudeck

Rashid Bashir is an American engineer and academic who is the incoming chancellor of the University of Wisconsin–Madison, a position he will assume in February 2027.

He is currently serving as the 15th dean of the Grainger College of Engineering and vice chancellor for strategic partnerships Chicago at the University of Illinois Urbana-Champaign. He is also a professor of bioengineering and the Grainger Distinguished Chair in Engineering, with faculty appointments in electrical and computer engineering, materials science and engineering, mechanical science and engineering, and molecular and integrative physiology. He is a member of the Beckman Institute, the Carl R. Woese Institute for Genomic Biology, and the Social and Behavioral Science Institute. In November 2026, Bashir was named as the incoming chancellor of the University of Wisconsin–Madison, a position he will assume in February 2027.

== Education and early career ==
Bashir received his B.S. in electrical engineering from Texas Tech University and his M.S. and Ph.D. in electrical engineering from Purdue University in 1989 and 1992, respectively. He spent six years at the National Semiconductor Corporation, rising to senior engineering manager, where his team led the development and commercialization of four generations of analog, high-voltage, and RF microelectronics manufacturing technologies.

== Academic career ==
He began his academic career at Purdue University, where he spent ten years and expanded his research to biomedical applications of micro- and nanotechnology. He held a visiting scientist position at Massachusetts General Hospital and Shriners Hospital for Children and was a visiting professor of surgery at Harvard Medical School. At Purdue, he received the Ruth and Joel Spira Outstanding Teacher Award and an NSF Faculty Early CAREER Award. He joined the University of Illinois Urbana-Champaign in 2007 as director of the Holonyak Micro and Nanotechnology Laboratory, a campus-wide resource for cleanroom fabrication and bionanotechnology, and in 2013 became head of the department of bioengineering. He was a member of the founding team of the Carle Illinois College of Medicine, the world's first engineering-based college of medicine, where he co-chaired the curriculum development committee and served as executive associate dean. He helped launch the Mayo-Illinois Alliance for Technology-Based Healthcare, as well as the Healthcare Engineering Systems Center and the Jump ARCHES program with OSF HealthCare—supported by a $112 million endowment from a private donor and OSF HealthCare—to foster collaboration across engineering, medicine, and the social sciences.

In 2018, he was appointed the 15th dean of the College of Engineering (renamed the Grainger College of Engineering in 2019). As dean, he oversees a college of approximately 12,000 undergraduate students, 6,800 graduate students, and more than 550 faculty. The college holds some of the largest academic–corporate partnerships in the country, including with IBM and Foxconn Interconnect Technologies, and international partnerships with institutions in Singapore, Vietnam, Brazil, Taiwan, India, China, and Japan. He oversaw the formation of the Siebel School of Computing and Data Science. He was involved with the launch of the Illinois Quantum and Microelectronics Park in Chicago, where he serves as vice chair of the board of managers, and he now oversees the Discovery Partners Institute in Chicago as a hub of Responsible AI led by the University of Illinois Urbana-Champaign working with the governor's office, DCEO, and the IEDC on both initiatives. He was also on the founding team that brought the Chan Zuckerberg Biohub to Chicago and serves on its executive advisory committee. In his role as vice chancellor for strategic partnerships, he coordinates the campus's strategy and partnerships in Chicago.

He is a scholar in microfluidics and nanotechnology-based diagnostics for precision and personalized medicine in sepsis and infection management, and in the 3D biofabrication of multicellular engineered living systems for biohybrid robotics. He has authored or co-authored more than 340 journal papers, has been granted more than 65 patents. He has graduated 37 Ph.D. students and more than 20 master’s students and has mentored more than 35 postdoctoral fellows. His former students and postdocs hold faculty positions at MIT, Louisiana State University, Louisiana Tech, Rutgers, the University of Delaware, North Carolina Central University, the University of Wisconsin–Milwaukee, UCSF, Notre Dame, Boise State, Gachon University, Konyang University, Yonsei University, Chung-Ang University, and IIT Kanpur. His research has been funded by NSF, NIH, USDA, DOD, industry, and other sources; he has served as PI of an NSF graduate training grant and an NIH training grant, among other centers, and has led the development of outreach and training programs for students in grades 5–12. He is an academic co-founder of two current startups—VedaBio, Inc. (San Diego), and Prenosis, Inc. (Chicago). He also serves on the boards of Carle Health (East Region), P33 Chicago, and Hope Village in Urbana.

Bashir has received an NSF Faculty Early CAREER Award, the Ruth and Joel Spira Outstanding Teacher Award, the 2012 IEEE EMBS Technical Achievement Award, and the 2018 Pritzker Distinguished Lecture Award from the Biomedical Engineering Society (BMES). He received the 2021 Professional Impact Award for Education from the American Institute for Medical and Biological Engineering (AIMBE). He is a fellow of 7 professional societies (IEEE, BMES, AIMBE, APS, IAMBE, RSC, and AAAS). He was elected a fellow of the National Academy of Inventors in 2018, a member of the National Academy of Medicine in 2023, and a member of the American Academy of Arts and Sciences in 2024.
