= C3 AI =

American technology company

C3.ai, Inc.
- Type: Public
- Traded as: NYSE: AI
- ISIN: US12468P1049
- Industry: Software / Artificial intelligence
- Incorporated: Delaware, United States
- Founded: 2009; 17 years ago
- Founder: Thomas Siebel
- Headquarters: Redwood City, California, U.S.
- Key people: Thomas Siebel (CEO); Stephen Ehikian (President)
- Products: C3 Agentic AI Platform; C3 AI Applications; C3 Generative AI
- Revenue: US$ 389.1 million (FY2025)
- Net income: US$ –288.7 million (FY2025)
- Total assets: US$ 1.03 billion (FY2025)
- Total equity: US$ 838.3 million (FY2025)
- Number of employees: 1181 (April 30, 2025)
- Website: c3.ai

C3.ai (stylized as C3 AI) is an American information technology company specializing in enterprise artificial intelligence. Based in Redwood City, California, the company was founded in 2009 by Thomas Siebel and became a public company in 2020 on the New York Stock Exchange.

== History ==
C3 AI was founded in 2009 by Thomas Siebel as "C3". Originally the "C" in the company's name was a reference to "carbon" and the "3" was a reference to "measure, mitigate and monetize" because the company's original goal was to help manage corporate carbon footprints.

For some time in 2016 the company was named C3IoT and before that was briefly named C3 Energy.

On September 3, 2025 C3 AI announced that Stephen Ehikian, former acting administrator of the General Services Administration, had been appointed chief executive officer (CEO) effective September 1, with Siebel continuing as executive chairman.

On May 8, 2026, Thomas Siebel returned as the CEO of the company, while Ehikan became the president.

== IPO ==
C3 AI held its initial public offering (IPO) on 9 December 2020, listing its Class A common stock on the New York Stock Exchange (NYSE) under the ticker symbol AI. The company priced its 15.5 million shares at US $42.00 per share, expecting to raise approximately US $651 million in gross proceeds. Concurrently, Spring Creek Capital (affiliated with Koch Industries) and Microsoft purchased US $100 million and US $50 million, respectively, in a private placement at the IPO price. The offering was led by Morgan Stanley, J.P. Morgan, and BofA Securities as lead underwriters, with Deutsche Bank Securities, Canaccord Genuity, JMP Securities, KeyBanc Capital Markets, Needham & Company, and Piper Sandler serving as co-managers.

On November 25, 2020, prior to the IPO, the company executed a 6-for-1 reverse stock split of its common and preferred stock.

C3 AI implemented a dual-class share structure in which Class A common stock had one vote per share, while Class B common stock had 50 votes per share. Following the IPO, CEO Tom Siebel and related entities controlled the voting power of all Class B common stock, and approximately 33.29% of outstanding capital stock, controlling approximately 71.96% of the voting power. As of April 30, 2025, Siebel and related entities owned approximately 87.8% of Class B common stock and approximately 19.4% of outstanding Class A common stock, controlling approximately 52.4% of voting power.

C3 AI's shares more than doubled on their first day of trading, closing at US$92.49 on 9 December 2020 at a market capitalization of US$8.9 billion. Several days later, the stock reached its all-time high close of US$177.47 on 22 December 2020, and the following day it touched an intraday high of US$183.9. Since then the shares prices have fallen and as of June 2024 they were nearly 74% below their first day of trading. In February 2026 shares of C3 AI were trading at US$10.40.

Following their IPO C3 AI faced market skepticism and criticism, including that Siebel liquidated shares worth hundreds of millions of dollars in the months after the IPO.
