= Stephen Ehikian =

American Deputy Administrator of the GSA

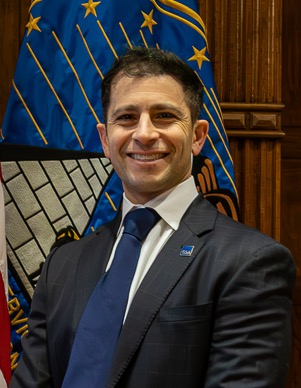
- Ehikian in 2025

Administrator of General Services
- Acting; January 20, 2025 – July 21, 2025
- President: Donald Trump
- Preceded by: Robin Carnahan
- Succeeded by: Michael Rigas (acting)

Deputy Administrator of the General Services Administration
- In office January 20, 2025 – September 2, 2025
- President: Donald Trump
- Preceded by: Katy Kale
- Succeeded by: Mike Lynch

Personal details
- Born: 1980 (age 45–46) or 1981 (age 44–45)
- Education: Yale University (B.S. in Mechanical Engineering and Economics); Stanford University (MBA)
- Occupation: CEO of C3.ai; entrepreneur
- Known for: Co-founder and CEO of Airkit; leadership roles at Salesforce; GSA Administrator

Stephen Ehikian (born 1980 or 1981) is the chief executive officer of C3 AI, an enterprise artificial intelligence company, and a former government official during the Trump administration between January and September 2025. Ehikian was appointed Acting Administrator and Deputy Administrator of the General Services Administration (GSA) on January 21, 2025. In March 2025, he delegated the responsibilities of deputy administrator to senior adviser Mike Lynch. In July 2025, he was replaced as acting administrator by Michael Rigas, but remained at GSA in his role as deputy administrator. Prior to GSA, Ehikian was the Vice President of AI Products at Salesforce and cofounded a startup named Airkit.ai.

On September 2, 2025, Ehikian announced that he would be stepping down from his role as GSA deputy administrator. On September 3, C3 AI announced that Ehikian had been appointed CEO effective September 1.

== Education and early career ==
Stephen Ehikian obtained undergraduate degrees in Mechanical Engineering and Economics from Yale University. He later obtained a Master of Business Administration degree from the Stanford Graduate School of Business, which he pursued jointly with a master of science degree in Environment and Resources.

Early in his career, Ehikian worked in the finance sector with positions at Morgan Stanley, Westbrook Partners, and SRS Investment Management.

Ehikian is from Atherton, California. He is married to Andrea Conway, who was a designer at X. His brother is Brad Ehikian, partner at Palo Alto-based commercial real estate firm Premier Properties.

== Business career ==
=== RelateIQ ===
After completing his MBA, Ehikian served as COO of startup RelateIQ, which was founded by Palantir alumni Steve Loughlin and Adam Evans in 2011. RelateIQ was a sales-intelligence startup that automatically captured data from email, calendar, phone records, and other communications to provide real-time insights and recommendations for managing customer relationships.

RelateIQ raised $9 million in Series A funding from investors Accel, Morgenthaler, and SV Angel. It emerged out of stealth in June 2013, announcing a $20 million Series B round led by Formation 8 (Palantir co-founder Joe Lonsdale’s venture capital firm) and Accel. It then raised a $40 million Series C round in March 2014 at a $245 million valuation. In July 2014, Salesforce acquired RelateIQ in a stock swap transaction valued at $350 million in Salesforce shares, plus $40 million from RelateIQ’s cash balance, for a total acquisition price of $390 million. Ehikian and Evans continued working at Salesforce post-acquisition.

In September 2015, as part of the 2015 Dreamforce conference, RelateIQ was rebranded as SalesforceIQ. On March 13, 2020, the SalesforceIQ product was retired.

=== Airkit.ai ===
In 2017, Ehikian and Evans left Salesforce to co-found the startup originally known as Ruist, later rebranded as Airkit, and subsequently Airkit.ai in stealth mode. The startup offered a low-code customer engagement platform for businesses to quickly build digital customer applications and workflows without extensive coding expertise. It charged businesses a subscription fee for the license to use its platform to build apps, and it also charged based on the volume of usage. Ehikian served as CEO and Evans as CTO.

Airkit emerged from stealth mode in October 2020, announcing it had raised $28 million in funding from investors Accel (by then Loughlin was a partner at Accel), Emergence Capital, and Salesforce Ventures including a $21 million Series A round in January 2020. Airkit announced a $40 million Series B round led by EQT Ventures in May 2021.

In August 2023, the company rebranded as Airkit.ai and launched Airkit.ai eCommerce, a platform powered by ChatGPT-4 for retail brands to build autonomous customer-service AI agents. In October 2023, Salesforce signed an agreement to acquire Airkit for an undisclosed amount after which Airkit was integrated into Salesforce’s Service Cloud, with Evans continuing as head of that business unit. As part of the acquisition Ehikian was to continue as a non-executive employee at Salesforce through February 2024 to facilitate the success of the acquisition.

Salesforce used technology from the acquisition to launch Agentforce, its platform that allows companies to build and deploy autonomous AI agents.

== Career as Trump administration political appointee ==
Ehikian was appointed Acting Administrator and Deputy Administrator of the GSA on January 21, 2025. As acting administrator of GSA, Ehikian oversaw federal real estate and buildings, technology services, and $110 billion in federal contracts. During his first week as acting administrator, Ehikian outlined his goals of relocating agencies outside of D.C., removing DEI, environmental, and climate mandates on federal building construction and GSA contractors, and downsizing GSA's building portfolio. In February 2025, the GSA notified staff that it intended to reduce total spending by 50% across all programs and personnel.

On February 18, Ehikian appointed Frank Schuler as senior adviser, who coordinated with DOGE member Nate Cavanaugh. ProPublica reported that Schuler had for years been promoting and profiting from "syndicated conservation easements", a tax-shelter scheme that financial authorities tried to shut down for years. At the time, Schuler's firm was battling the IRS in court for over $4 billion in disallowed charitable deductions for thousands of his clients.

On April 21, 2025, Ehikian was sued as part of a lawsuit filed by Harvard University alleging its funding freezes were illegal. Harvard later won the lawsuit.

In July 2025, Ehikian was replaced as acting administrator by Michael Rigas and moved into a supporting deputy director role within GSA.

=== Sale of federal properties ===
GSA announced the reduction of its real estate portfolio by 50%, and plans to terminate 660 building leases by the end of 2025. On March 4, the GSA published a list of 443 properties to be sold, including headquarters, courthouses, and 47 Social Security Administration offices. That list was edited the same day to remove about 120 properties and then taken off the GSA website the next day. The public list included a previously undisclosed "highly sensitive federal complex in Springfield, Virginia" where the CIA conducts clandestine operations. GSA has also sent out over 800 lease termination notices, followed by 117 letters rescinding some of them.

=== Workforce reductions ===
Employees at the GSA were urged to take the so-called Fork in the Road resignation offer. In late January 2025, Ehikian wrote to employees "If you do not accept the deferred resignation offer, and are later impacted by future reduction in force or consolidation efforts, this offer will generally not be available to you."

On February 4, 2025, Ehikian told employees that the deferred resignation was just the "first step in streamlining the federal workforce." He stated that "returning to office will be the next step." He also said the GSA was looking to close and consolidate its 11 regional offices and 700 field offices across the US. Employees were told to report to the office full-time starting March 3. Ehikian warned the approximately 2,000 employees who live more than 50 miles from the nearest regional office that there was a "high probability" they may be assigned to an office farther away as part of the push to reduce the GSA’s footprint.

The Washington Post noted that the messaging appeared deliberately designed to increase attrition, as employees would not know if they had been reassigned to a farther office until days after they had to decide whether to accept voluntary resignation. An internal memo from May 22 noted that there were only 1,000 workstations for 1,200 employees at headquarters, and employees without a desk were told to look for "non-traditional seating options" like conference rooms and tables in the building’s atrium.

In February 2025, Ehikian called for cutting GSA's largest division, the Public Building Service, by more than 3,500 employees or 63% of the total workforce. In February 2025, the GSA dismissed about 100 tech workers within its Technology Transformation Services who were in their one year probationary period and, therefore, had weaker job protections. Various offices within the agency were called to meetings to justify their positions to Ehikian and other political appointees. Senior executives called those meetings "murder boards." Ehikian was a proponent of using artificial intelligence to reduce headcount with some GSA employees being asked to identify ways AI could automate their work responsibilities.

On February 24, 2025, Ehikian warned employees that the agency would be conducting a reduction in force and was also seeking to offer employees Voluntary Early Retirement Authority (VERA).

On Saturday, March 1, 2025, the GSA eliminated 18F, a digital consulting office within GSA's Technology Transformation Services (TTS), and fired its 70 tech workers at 1:00 a.m. 18F employees reported that they had been locked out of their computers and emails, and that they could not find out where to return equipment. 18F had previously been the target of false claims from rightwing activists and from Elon Musk that it was a far-left cell inside the government.

On March 3, 2025, the GSA issued reduction-in-force notices to approximately 600 employees with nearly 40% of the staff at its San Francisco office being let go. Then, on March 5, 2025 the agency issued reduction-in-force notices to more than 90% of its 200 employees at the northwest region of its Public Buildings Service. On March 6, 2025 the GSA issued notices to nearly all its staffers (over 100 staffers) at the Office of the Chief Financial Officer in the Washington, D.C. area.

On March 3, 2025, Ehikian closed at least five regional offices of the fine arts and historic preservation units at the GSA, and placed more than 36 staffers on leave pending their terminations. The group preserved and maintained over 26,000 pieces of art owned by the federal government.

By May 2025, over 2,100 GSA employees had accepted deferred resignations and the GSA had laid off about 1,000 employees for a total reduction of nearly 25% of its workforce.

Ehikian stated that the workforce reductions were about "moving people from maybe lower productivity roles to a higher productivity in the private sector."

=== Attempted purchase of USGS Menlo Park campus ===
On February 3, 2025, two weeks after Ehikian's appointment, the GSA received an unsolicited offer from Ehikian's younger brother and Bay Area real estate developer, Brad Ehikian, to purchase a federally-owned 17-acre property in Menlo Park, California in the heart of Silicon Valley for $65 million. The Ehikian brothers had previously co-owned and transacted commercial real estate such as a warehouse and retail property in Redwood City that they bought for $1 million in 2003 and sold for $1.2 million the following year. The property, named Rockaway Grove, housed the United States Geological Survey and contained laboratories, office space, a child care facility, and a credit union across 17 buildings. The GSA had previously tried to sell the property in an auction in August 2022 with a minimum bid of $120 million but the auction closed without a buyer.

The unsolicited offer prompted a complaint to the GSA inspector general's office that a relative of the acting administrator was trying to buy a property at below-market value. A GSA spokeswoman stated that Stephen Ehikian had recused himself from his brother's proposal. The GSA informed all interested parties that it intended to sell the property in a public auction. Brad Ehikian withdrew his offer on February 16, 2025. The GSA launched a sealed-bid auction to sell the property on February 28, 2025 with a minimum bid of $85 million. The auction closed on April 15, 2025, and the property sold to San Francisco-based Presidio Bay Ventures who placed an all-cash offer of $137 million. The auction received three qualifying bids with the second-highest bid being $120 million. Presidio Bay Ventures announced on August 11, 2025 that it would begin hosting community meetings to determine what to build on the campus.

=== Department of Government Efficiency (DOGE) activities ===
During Ehikian’s tenure at the GSA, the agency served as a hub for many staffers involved in the DOGE cost-cutting effort. Ehikian was listed as a DOGE ally by The New York Times, The Washington Post, and ProPublica. A GSA press release following his appointment as acting administrator said he would "drive maximum efficiency in government procurement for the benefit of all taxpayers, and will work closely with the DOGE team to do so."

In a March 25 blog post laying out his vision for the GSA, Ehikian said GSA was "the tip of the spear," and that it was "setting the example for other agencies and serving as a collaborative partner to help them cut wasteful contract spending, right size the federal real estate portfolio and deploy software to drive efficiency and productivity."

Elon Musk visited the GSA on January 30, 2025 and met with Ehikian. After the meeting, officials discussed a plan to eliminate 50% of expenditures. Ehikian told staffers that he wanted them to apply zero-based budgeting at the GSA in which budgets are set to zero and every expense must be justified from scratch.

By mid-February, the GSA had installed Starlink at the headquarters building to be used by DOGE staffers. Starlink was installed days after DOGE staffers made a request, although the process would typically take weeks or months. On April 17, the Associated Press reported that employees had found at least two Starlink transceivers, including one with a wire running to Ehikian’s office. GSA IT staff opened an investigation to determine whether the terminals posed a security threat, and an employee filed a complaint with the agency’s inspector general.

On March 6, news outlets reported that the GSA served as a bunkhouse for DOGE staffers, where workers set up at least four separate rooms on the 6th floor with IKEA beds, lamps, dressers, and a children's play area with toys and stuffed animals. GSA was considering installing a washer and dryer on the floor. The area where they worked was redesigned with a locked door and a security guard. On March 20, Ehikian hosted his first all-hands meeting at GSA. When asked about the DOGE team, Ehikian responded that no such team existed.

On April 23, 2025, after Elon Musk told investors he would be significantly scaling back his government work to focus on his businesses, Politico stated that DOGE staffers remained at several agencies and some were based out of the GSA, which was now a DOGE nerve center.

On July 7, as Musk was threatening to finance a third party, Politico stated that GSA remained a DOGE stronghold staffed with dozens of DOGE employees, and a DOGE-branded X account actively promoting DOGE activities.

On May 29, the White House announced that the operational head of DOGE, Steve Davis, would no longer be a government employee. However, he continued asking for DOGE updates and making requests, and led a DOGE meeting on the 6th floor of the GSA where he announced a DOGE 2.0. Concerned employees consulted with the DOGE general counsel who stated that Davis was no longer a government employee.

Davis dispatched three allies, Ehikian and Josh Gruenbaum at the GSA and Anthony Armstrong at the Office of Personnel Management (OPM), to assess employees' loyalty and installed them as the new leaders of DOGE. A Politico source stated that the trio claimed authority from the White House, but that the White House stressed they only had authority at the GSA. A senior Trump administration official, however, denied the account. Following these events, the White House started conversations about finding a new acting administrator in mid-June.

President Trump replaced Ehikian with Mike Rigas as acting administrator on July 21, 2025, though Ehikian was to remain as deputy administrator. On July 23, WIRED reported that DOGE staffers had largely moved out of the 6th floor of the GSA where they left behind bedding and children's toys. Rigas installed 10 officials in areas of the agency where DOGE staffers had held the most influence. Most of the new officials detailed to the GSA had ties to the first Trump administration. On July 29, 2025, publication Government Executive reported that Ehikian and Josh Gruenbaum, had not been seen in the office in recent days.

Politico reported that a person close to DOGE remarked that with Ehikian losing his role as GSA acting administrator, DOGE had lost all remaining influence.

== See also ==
- Network of the Department of Government Efficiency
- Department of Government Efficiency
- US federal agencies targeted by DOGE
- 2025 United States federal mass layoffs
