= Thomas M. Siebel Center for Computer Science =

Academic building in Urbana, IL

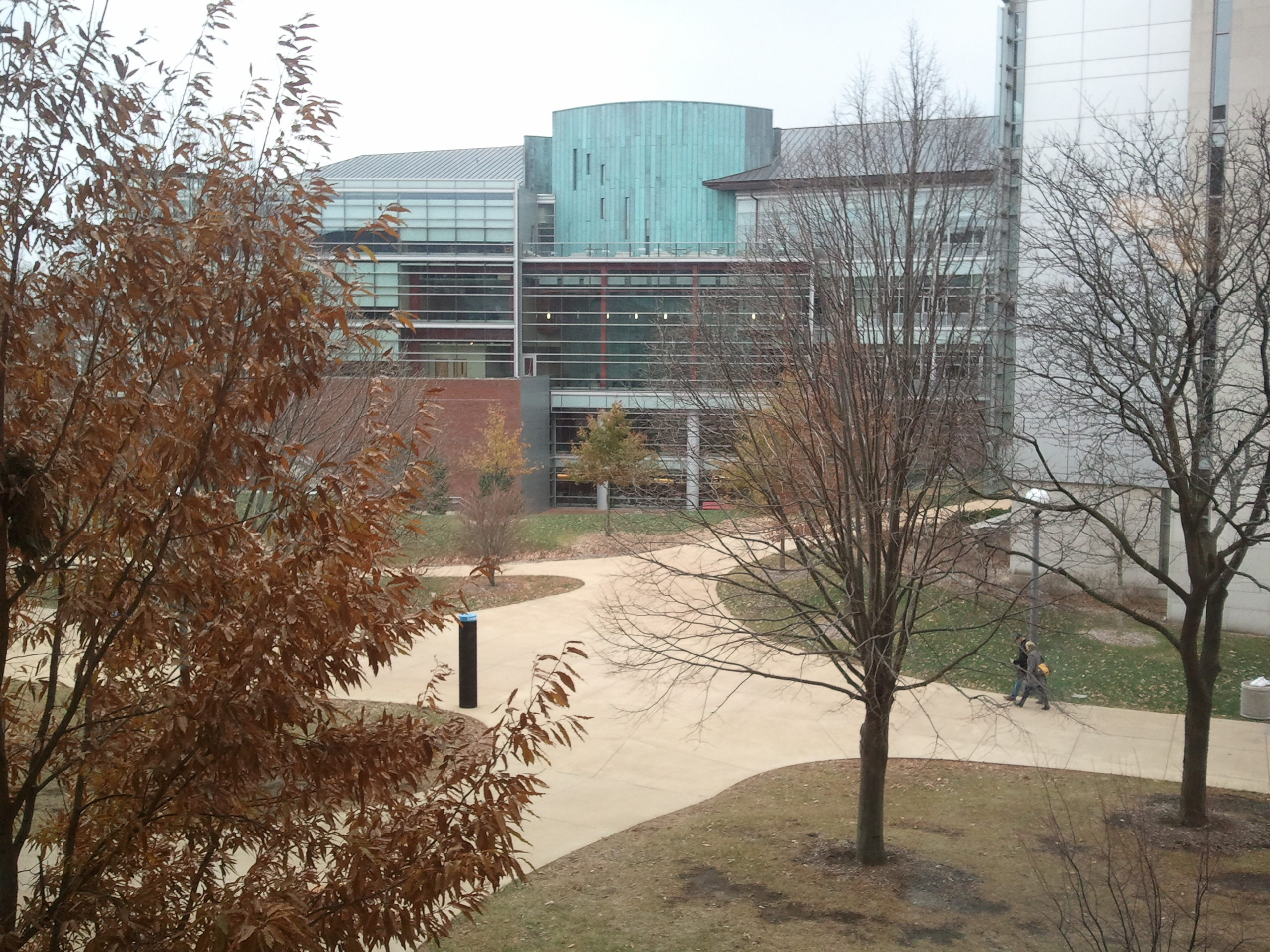

General information
- Type: Academic
- Location: 201 N. Goodwin Avenue; Urbana, Illinois 61801; United States
- Coordinates: 40°6′50.06″N 88°13′29.20″W
- Groundbreaking: November 15, 2001
- Completed: 2004

Technical details
- Floor count: 4
- Floor area: 225,000 sq ft (20,900 m^{2})

Design and construction
- Architect: Bohlin Cywinski Jackson

The Thomas M. Siebel Center for Computer Science is a research and educational facility located on the Urbana campus at the University of Illinois. The Siebel Center houses the Department of Computer Science of the Grainger College of Engineering. Designed by Bohlin Cywinski Jackson, the center has 225,000 sq ft (20,900 m^{2}) of research, office, and laboratory space. The Siebel Center claims to be the first "Computing Habitat", featuring a fully interactive environment and intelligent building system. The facility is equipped with computer-controlled locks, proximity and location sensors, cameras to track room activity, and other sensory and control features.

The building is dedicated to Thomas Siebel in recognition of his donation that funded a portion of the construction.

The building received the Award for Outstanding Engineering Achievement from the Illinois Engineering Council in 2004, and the Honor Award from the Pittsburgh chapter of the American Institute of Architects in 2008.
