= Thomas Siebel =

American businessman

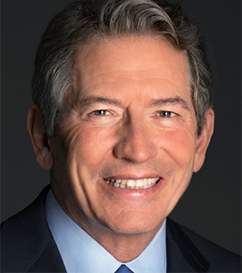
- Siebel in 2013
- Born: Chicago, Illinois, U.S.
- Education: University of Illinois Urbana-Champaign (BA, MBA, MS)
- Occupations: Software developer and businessman
- Known for: Founder of Siebel Systems and C3 AI
- Spouse: Stacey Siebel
- Children: 4
- Relatives: Jennifer Siebel Newsom (second cousin once removed)
- Website: Thomas M. Siebel

Thomas M. Siebel (/ˈsiːbəl/) is an American businessman, information technologist, and author. He founded the enterprise software company Siebel Systems and is the founder, chairman, and CEO of C3.ai, an artificial intelligence software platform and applications company.

== Early life and education ==
Thomas M. Siebel was born in Chicago, being one of seven children of Arthur Francis Siebel and Ruth A. (née Schmid) Siebel.

He graduated from the University of Illinois with a BA in history, an MBA and an MS in computer science.

== Career ==
Siebel was an executive at Oracle Corporation between 1984 and 1990, holding several management positions. He was the CEO of Gain Technology, a multimedia software company that merged with Sybase in December 1992. Siebel later founded Siebel Systems, where he was chairman and CEO before Oracle acquired the company in January 2006.

He is the chairman of First Virtual Group, a holding company with participating interests in different sectors of activity.

=== Siebel Systems ===
In 1989, as an executive at Oracle, Siebel proposed turning an internal sales-force automation tool called Oasis (Oracle automated sales information system) into a commercial product, but Larry Ellison declined, claiming to see no commercial potential.

In 1993, Siebel left Oracle and founded Siebel Systems, a software company primarily engaged in the design, development, marketing, and support of customer relationship management (CRM) applications.

By 1999, Siebel Systems was recognized by Deloitte & Touche as one of the most rapidly expanding technology companies in the United States. In 2000, Siebel reported that Siebel Systems had grown to over 8,000 employees in 32 countries, with more than 4,500 corporate customers and annual revenue exceeding $2 billion. Siebel Systems was acquired by Oracle in 2005.

=== C3 AI ===
Siebel founded enterprise artificial intelligence company C3 AI in 2009 and has led the company as CEO since 2011. He transitioned to the role of executive chairman in 2025 after being diagnosed with an autoimmune disease that left him visually impaired.

In 2019, Siebel initiated a program at C3 AI that covers the cost for employees to complete the University of Illinois’s online Master of Computer Science (MCS) degree through Coursera. Employees who complete the MCS receive a 15% salary increase, a $25,000 cash bonus, and additional stock options.

=== Net worth ===
As of 3 October 2026, Forbes put Siebel's real-time net worth at $4.6 billion.

== Other roles and activities ==
Siebel has held advisory and board positions at institutions including Stanford University, the University of Illinois, and the University of California, Berkeley.

He was a Trustee at Princeton University from 2008 to 2011. He has chaired the American Agora Foundation and been a director at the Hoover Institution at Stanford.

Siebel is the founder of the Montana Meth Project and the Siebel Scholars Foundation.

=== Philanthropy ===
In 2001, Siebel donated $32 million to the University of Illinois Department of Computer Science, his alma mater, for the construction of the Siebel Center for Computer Science, which opened in the spring of 2004. In 2006, he donated $4 million to the university to establish two endowed professorships: the Thomas M. Siebel Chair in the History of Science and the Thomas M. Siebel Chair in Computer Science. In 2007, Siebel pledged an additional $100 million gift to the university. By 2026, he had donated over $150 million to the university, including a 2024 gift to build the Siebel School of Computing and Data Science.

In 2015, the Siebel Foundation launched the Siebel Energy Institute to support research on the data management of energy infrastructure monitoring. In 2016, Siebel donated $25 million to fund the construction of the Siebel Center for Design at the University of Illinois, a 60,000-square-foot multidisciplinary facility designed by the architectural firm Bohlin Cywinski Jackson, which was completed in 2020.

In 2017, the Thomas and Stacey Siebel Foundation funded the Thomas M. Siebel Professor in Machine Learning at Stanford, with the inaugural appointee being Christopher Manning.

== Political involvement ==
In February 2022, Siebel donated $90,000 to the Canada convoy protest in Ottawa, which opposed COVID-19 vaccine mandates and restrictions.

In 2024, Siebel donated $500,000 to Donald Trump’s re-election campaign. Siebel also organized a fundraiser for the politician in September of the same year.

In 2025, Siebel donated $1 million toward funding efforts opposing California's Proposition 50, making him the third-largest single donor against the bill.

== Honors and awards ==
Siebel received an honorary doctorate in engineering from the University of Illinois.

Barron's ranked him among the world's top 25 philanthropists in 2009 and 2010, and BusinessWeek included him in its list of The 50 Most Generous Philanthropists in 2007 and 2008.

== Personal life ==
Siebel married Stacey Siebel, with whom he has four children. Siebel is the second cousin of Jennifer Siebel Newsom, the First Partner of California and wife of Governor Gavin Newsom.

Siebel has had among the highest personal CO_{2} emissions from private jet use of any American, ranking 1st in 2022.

=== Health ===
In August 2009, while in Tanzania, Siebel and a guide were observing a group of elephants from 200 yards away when an elephant charged at the guide and then turned on Siebel, breaking several ribs, goring him in the left leg, and crushing the right. In September 2010, Siebel underwent 16 surgeries and an Ilizarov apparatus external fixator procedure to mend, lengthen, and reshape the tibia of his right leg. After 19 reconstructive surgeries over two and a half years, Siebel fully recovered. In 2013, National Geographic included Siebel's account in its TV series Dead or Alive: Trampled on Safari.

Siebel was diagnosed with giant cell arteritis in early 2025, which caused significant visual impairment.

== Selected publications ==
- Digital Transformation (2019) ISBN 1948122480
- "Digital Transformation: The Post-Industrial Utility" (Aspenia Magazine, June 2018)
- "Why digital transformation is now on the CEO’s shoulders" (McKinsey Quarterly, December 2017)
- "The Internet of Energy" (Electric Perspectives, March/April 2015)
- "Big Data and the Smart Grid: Is Hadoop the Answer?" (Stanford Energy Journal, October 21, 2014)
- Taking Care of eBusiness (2001) ISBN 0-385-50227-3
- Cyber Rules (with Pat House) (1999) ISBN 0385494122
- Virtual Selling (with Michael Malone) (1996) ISBN 0684822873
