= Grainger College of Engineering =

College of the University of Illinois

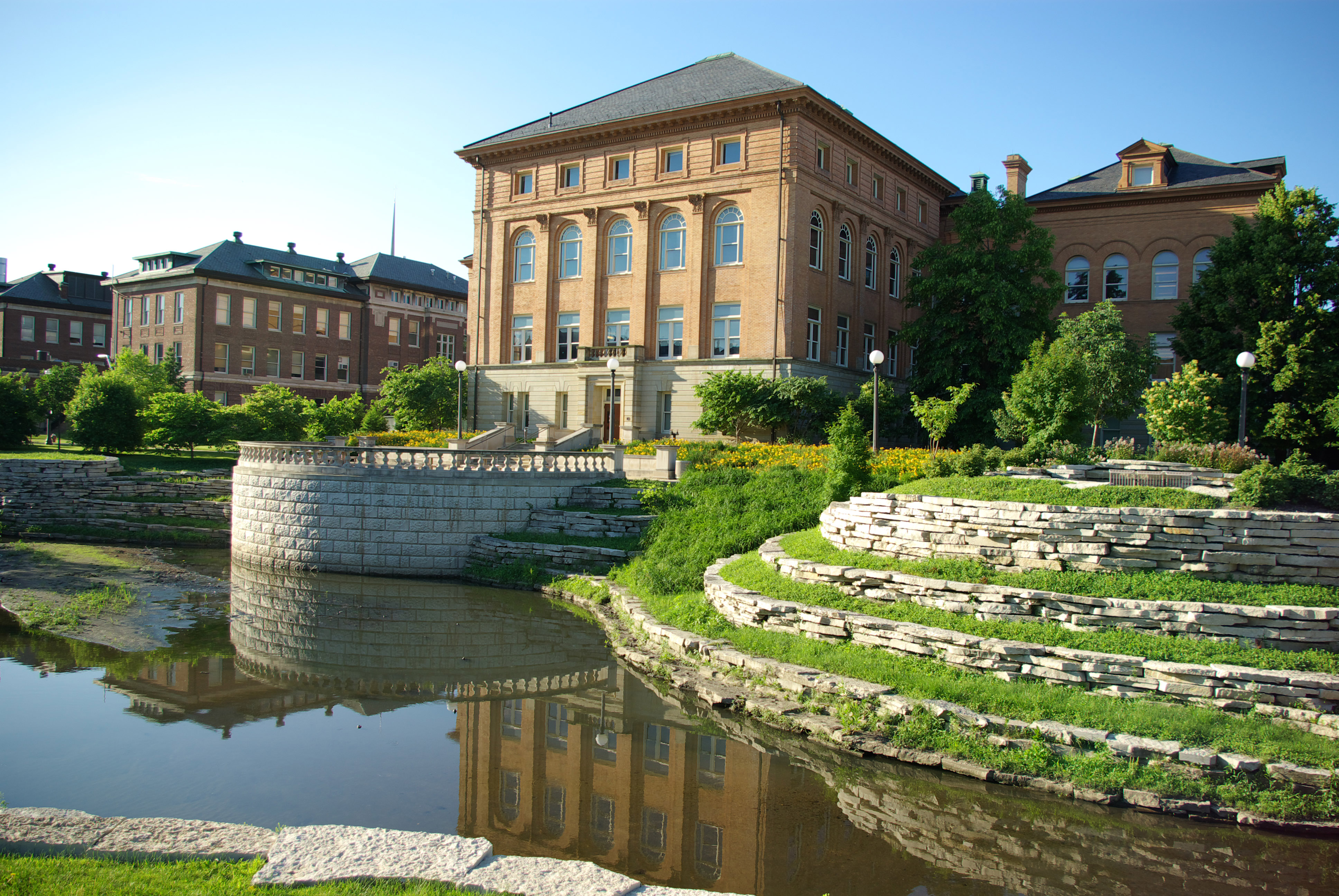
- Engineering Hall in 2008
- Established: 1868
- Dean: Rashid Bashir
- Faculty: 422
- Undergraduates: 5,943
- Postgraduates: 2,539
- Location: Urbana, Illinois; 40.1108°N 88.2270°W
- Website: grainger.illinois.edu

The Grainger College of Engineering is the engineering school of the University of Illinois Urbana-Champaign. The College was established in 1868 and is considered as one of the original units of the school. In 2019, the College of Engineering was renamed the Grainger College of Engineering, after the Grainger Foundation donated US$100 million as the latest of its US$300 million in donations to the college.

== Campus ==
The College of Engineering is located at the northern terminus of the University of Illinois, occupying the Bardeen Quadrangle, the Beckman Quadrangle, and many nearby areas.

The Engineering Hall was built in 1894, and is the oldest surviving building on the Engineering portion of campus. It was designed by George Bullard, a university alumnus, and is an example of the Renaissance Revival style of architecture.

The Bardeen Quad is home to the Grainger Engineering Library. The building cost just under $30 million and has 135,000 square feet (13,000 m²) of floor space.

== Departments ==
There are 12 departments within the College of Engineering.

The Department of Mechanical Science and Engineering (MechSE) was formed in 2006 through a merger of the Theoretical and Applied Mechanics Department with the Mechanical Engineering program from the previous Mechanical and Industrial Engineering Department. The department offers degrees in mechanical engineering (B.S., M.S., Ph.D.), engineering mechanics (B.S.), and theoretical and applied mechanics (M.S., Ph.D.). As of 2014, U.S. News & World Report ranked the program the sixth-best US school for undergraduate mechanical engineering program and fifth-best graduate mechanical engineering program.

The Siebel School of Computing and Data Science was established in 2024, funded largely by a donation from Thomas M. Siebel, and is part of the Grainger College of Engineering. The Thomas M. Siebel Center for Computer Science The Siebel School of Computing and Data Science was established in 2024, funded largely by a donation from Thomas M. Siebel, and is part of the Grainger College of Engineering. The Thomas M. Siebel Center for Computer Science had been built between 2004 and 2008.

== Rankings ==
According to the 2025-2026 U.S. News and World Report's rankings, the Grainger College of Engineering's undergraduate educational programs are overall ranked #5 (tied) nationally, and its graduate educational programs are overall ranked #6 nationally.

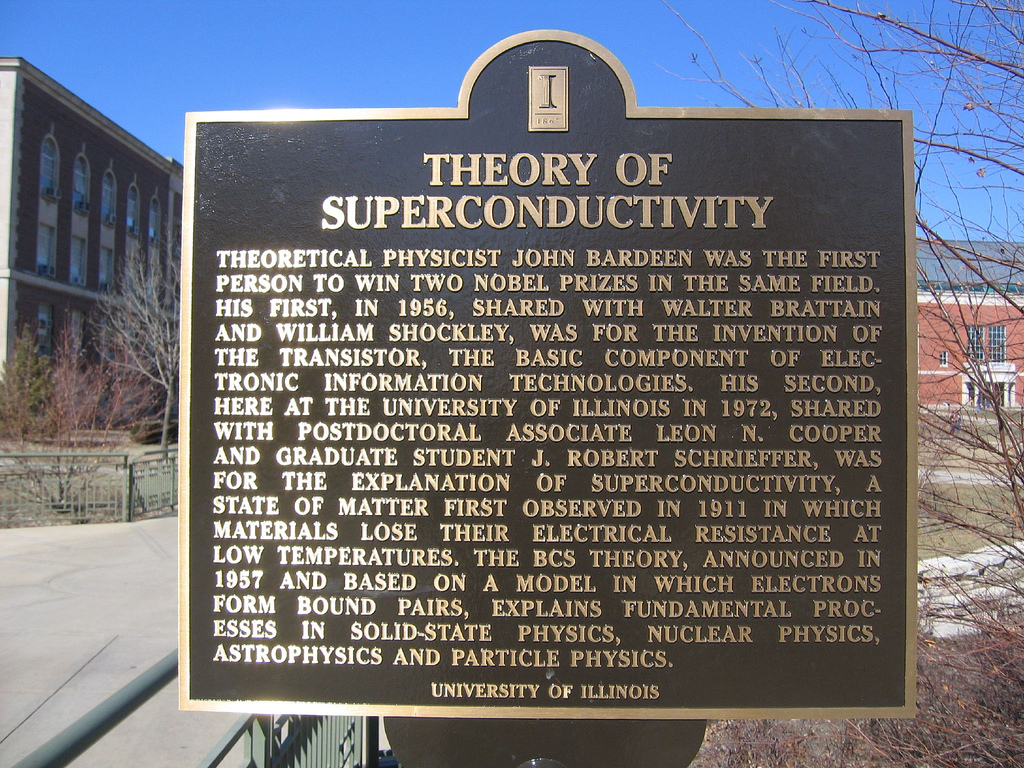
Plaque commemorating the Theory of Superconductivity, developed by John Bardeen.

== Notable alumni ==
- MiMi Aung, Project Manager for the Mars Ingenuity Helicopter, NASA Jet Propulsion Laboratory
- William F. Baker, civil engineer
- Richard Baraniuk, C. Sidney Burrus Professor of Electrical and Computer Engineering at Rice University and member of the National Academy of Engineering
- Stephen A. Boppart, Grainger Distinguished Chair in Engineering and head of the Biophotonics Imaging Laboratory at the University of Illinois Urbana-Champaign
- Alan Bovik, Cockrell Regents Family Professor Endowed Chair in Engineering at UT Austin and member of the National Academy of Engineering
- Jack Kilby, who developed the first integrated circuit in 1958, for which he shared the 2000 Nobel Prize in Physics
- Fazlur Rahman Khan, engineered the John Hancock Center and Sears Tower
- Arvind Krishna, chair and chief executive officer of IBM
- Mark Hersam, 2014 MacArthur Fellow and Walter P. Murphy Professor of Materials Science and Engineering at Northwestern University
- Nick Holonyak, who created the first practical visible-spectrum light-emitting diode (LED)
- Sergio Verdú, information theorist, Shannon Award Laureate (2007), and member of the National Academy of Engineering and National Academy of Sciences

== Leadership ==
The Deans of the Grainger College of Engineering include:

- Stillman W. Robinson, 1878
- Nathan C. Ricker, 1878–1905
- James M. White, 1905–1907
- William F. M. Goss, 1907–1917
- Charles Russ Richard, 1917–1922
- Milo S. Ketchum, 1922–1933
- Melvin L. Enger, 1934–1949
- William Everitt, 1949–1968
- Daniel C. Drucker, 1968–1984
- Mac Van Valkenburg, 1985–1987
- William Schowalter, 1988–2001
- David E. Daniel, 2001–2005
- Ilesanmi Adesida, 2006–2012
- Andreas C. Cangellaris, 2013–2018
- Rashid Bashir, 2018–Present

== See also ==
- Beckman Institute for Advanced Science and Technology
- Coordinated Science Laboratory
- National Center for Supercomputing Applications
