= Boneyard Creek =

Creek in Illinois, U.S.

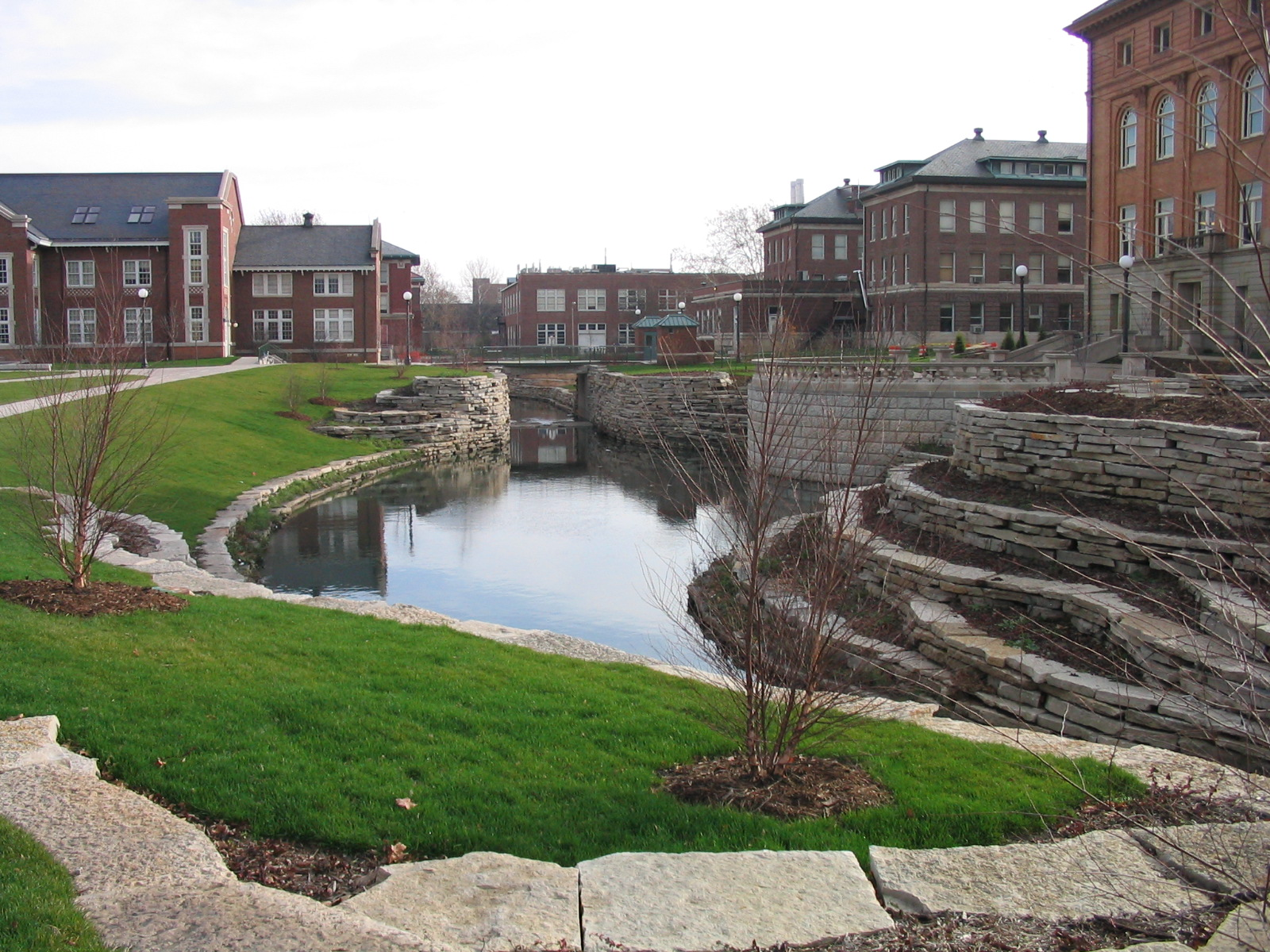
- The Boneyard flows through the UIUC Engineering Campus

Physical characteristics
- Source
  - location: City of Champaign, Illinois
  - coordinates: 40°07′30″N 88°14′16″W
- Mouth
  - location: Confluence with the Saline Branch, Urbana, Illinois
  - coordinates: 40°07′N 88°12′W
  - elevation: 728 ft (222 m)
- Length: 3.3 mi (5.3 km)

Basin features
- Progression: Boneyard Creek → Saline Branch → Salt Fork → Vermilion → Wabash → Ohio → Mississippi → Gulf of Mexico
- GNIS ID: 422378

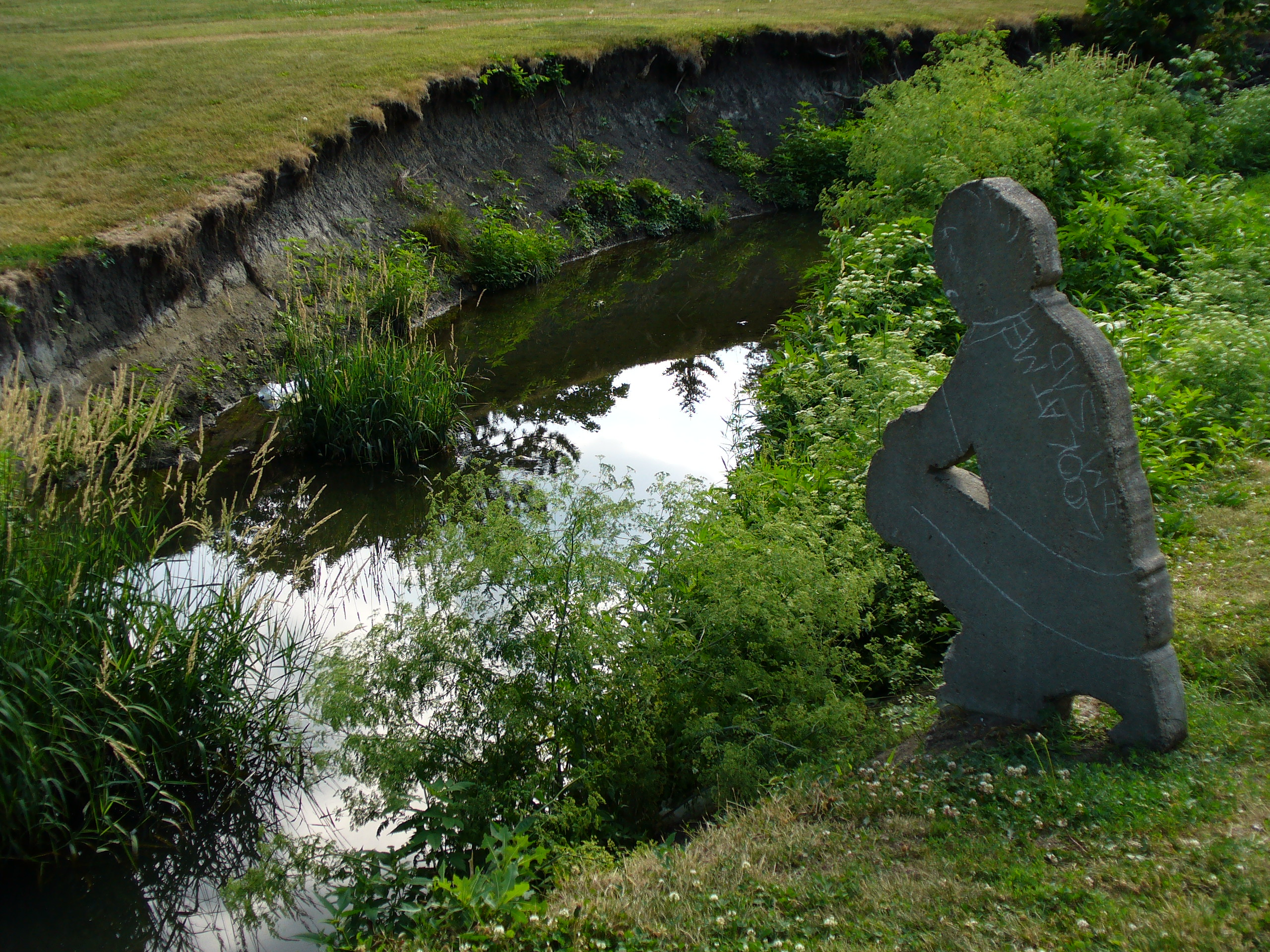
Concrete silhouette by Frank Gallo contemplated the Boneyard Creek in Scott Park until its excision in 2009.

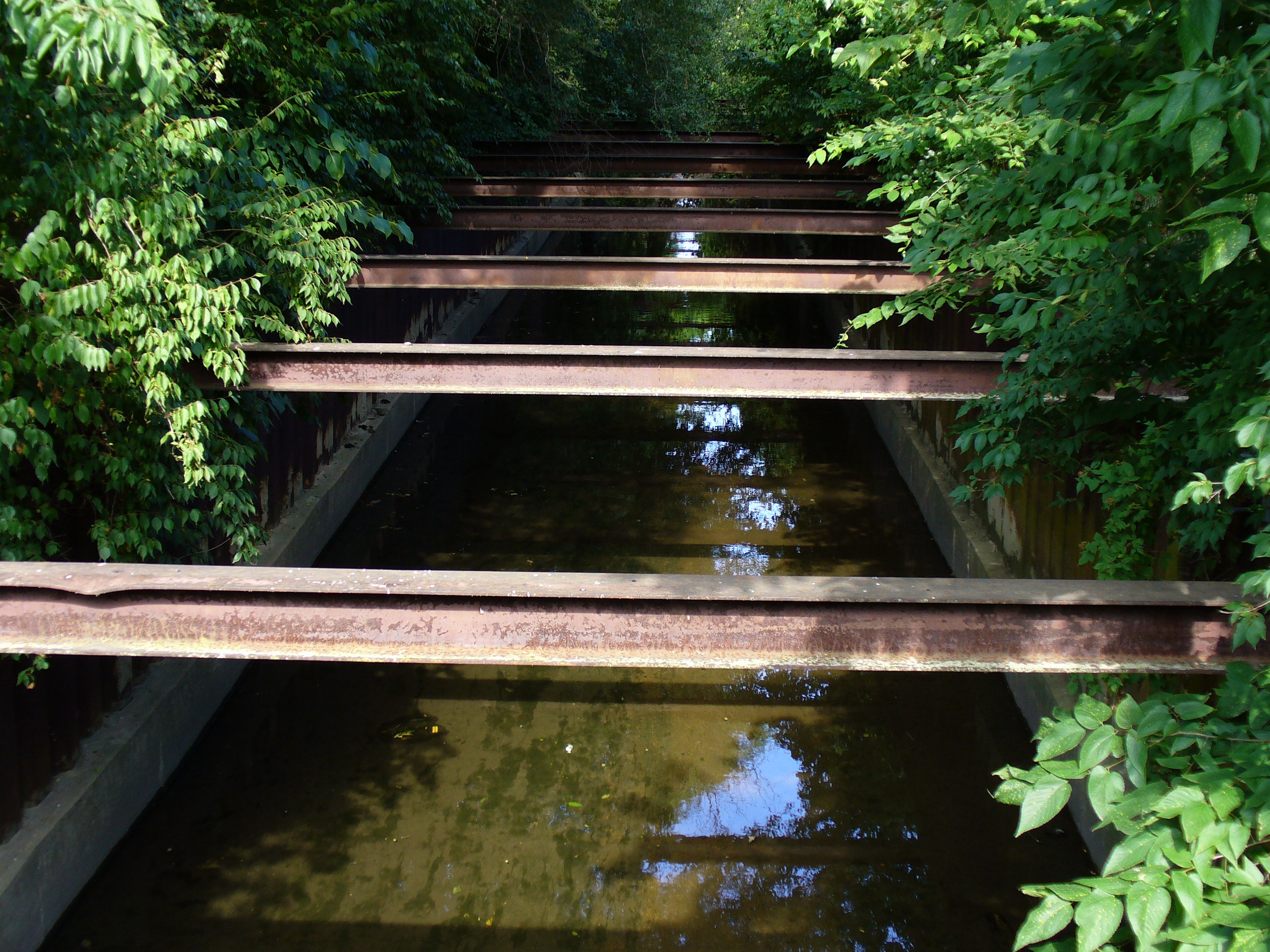
Boneyard encased in sheet piling in Urbana

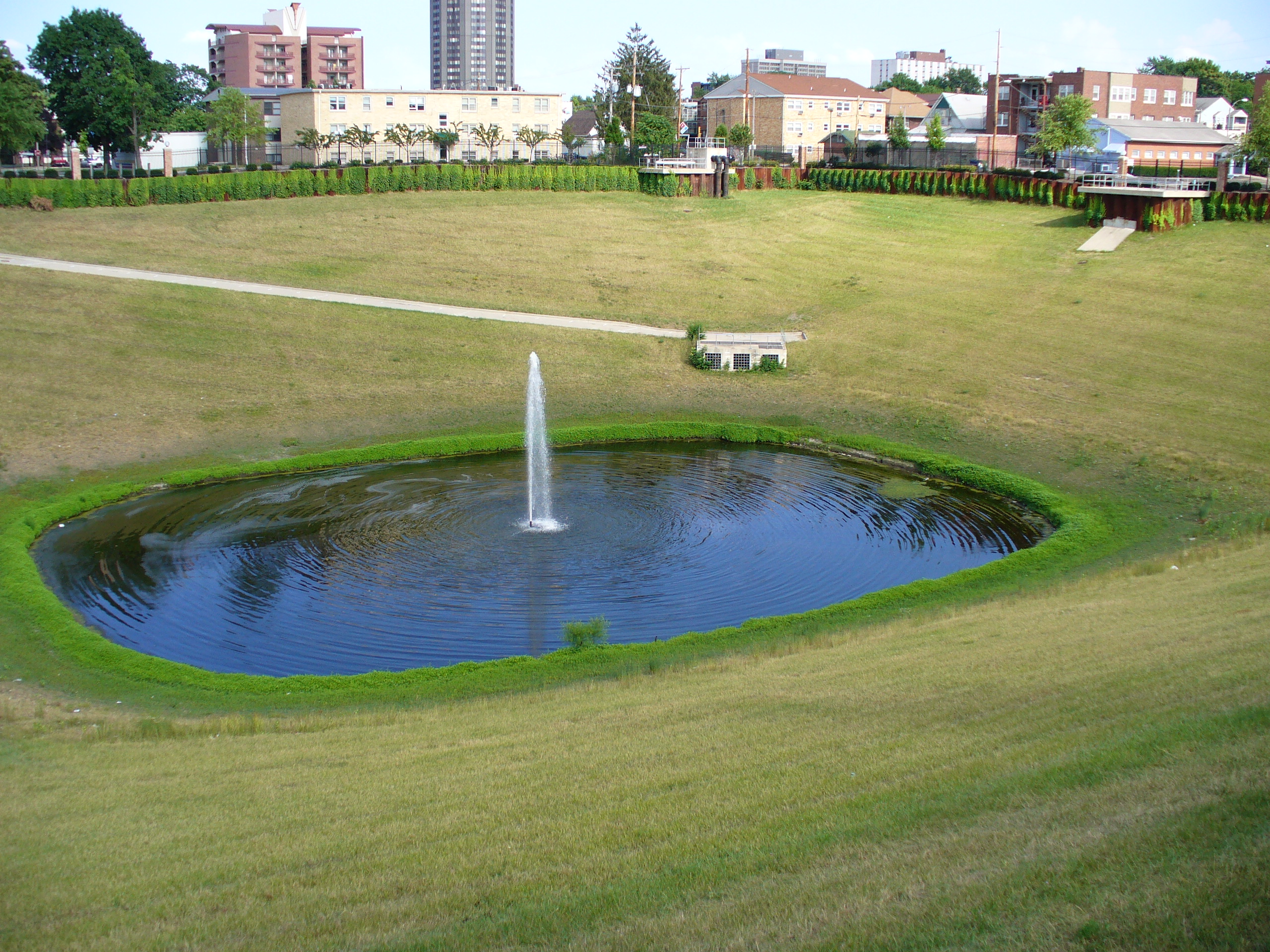
Boneyard detention basin - Also known as Healey Street Basin

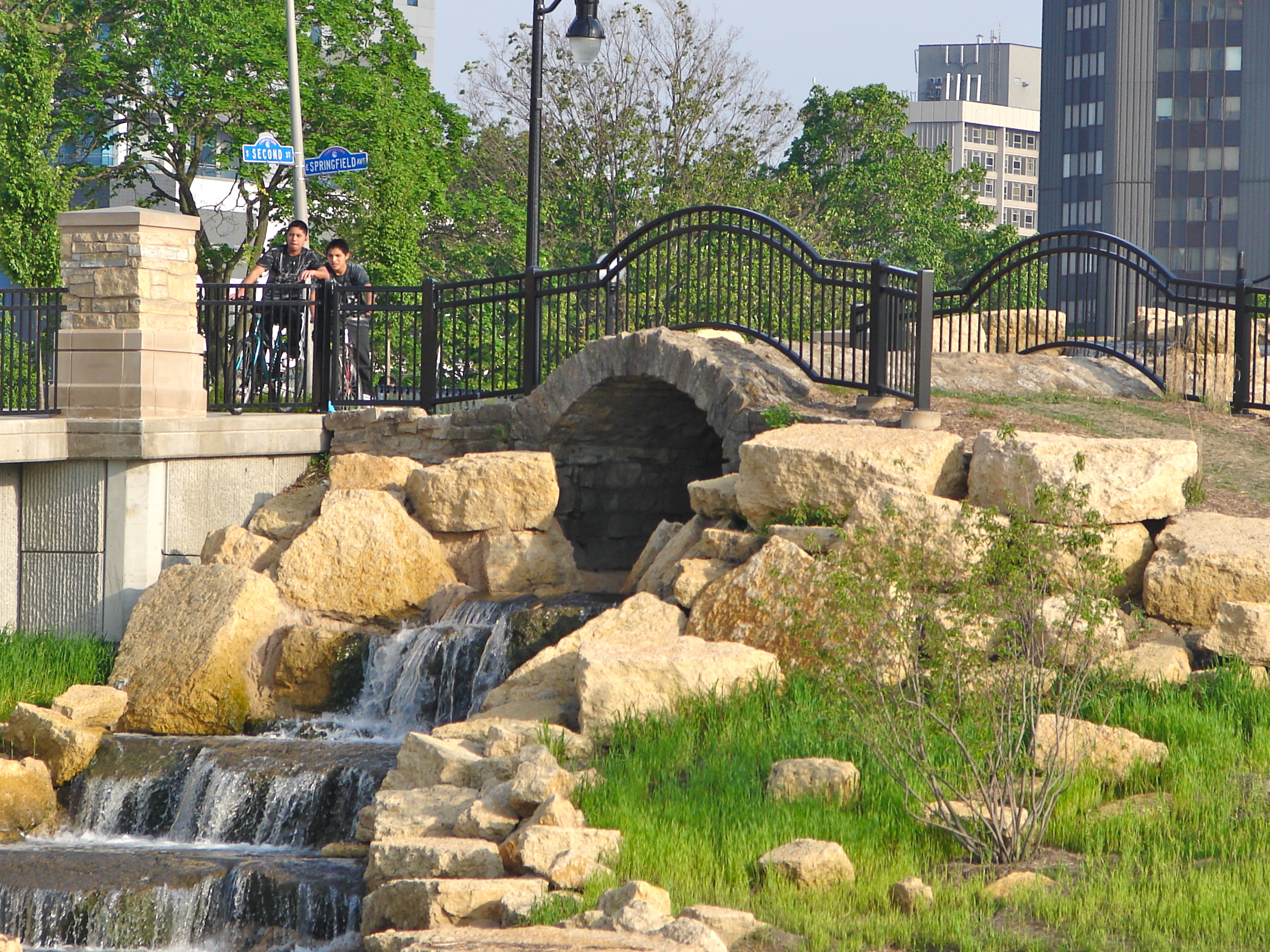
Flood control park at 2nd St. and Springfield Ave.

Boneyard Creek is a 3.3-mile-long (5.3 km) waterway that drains much of the cities of Champaign and Urbana, Illinois, United States. It is a tributary of the Saline Branch of the Salt Fork Vermilion River, which is a tributary of the south-flowing Vermilion River and the Wabash River. The creek flows through the northern sections of the campus of the University of Illinois Urbana-Champaign. The newsletter of the university's ACM chapter is Banks of the Boneyard, named after the creek.

== History ==
In pre-settlement times, the Boneyard, like most of the other watercourses of Champaign County, Illinois, was probably a series of connected wetlands without a clearly defined channel. With settlement, the drainage was "improved". Today the Boneyard is a highly channelized stream, running in a slit trench, with steel sheet pilings along much of its length.

There are several stories about the origin of the name "Boneyard". One is that the local Indians hung their dead over the stream, allowing the bones to fall into the creek, so that the creek was full of human bones when the first American settlers arrived. This could be an example of excarnation, which many Native American peoples indeed practiced. One problem with this story is that there have been no confirmed findings of human bones in excavations along the streams. In University of Illinois lore, the name "Boneyard" comes from the remains of poor students who could not handle the school's tough engineering curriculum. Another possible explanation is that the local Native Americans brought their "hunting kills" back to this area (communities would exist near local water sources) in order to clean and consume their food. The animal waste would likely have been located near the creek and bones would be the most likely waste to be found later.

In the 1950s, Professor Karl B. Lohmann, Professor of Landscape Architecture and Regional Planning at the University of Illinois, and Urbana Parks Commissioner, publicly advocated improving the Boneyard Creek.

Prior to the environmental movement in the late 1960s the Boneyard was an open sewer, with floating solids and a foul stench. During the 1970s, many sources of pollution were removed, and water quality gradually improved.

The Urbana-Champaign Sanitary District sewage outfall is located on the Saline Branch, just downstream from where the Boneyard enters that stream. Late in the 1970s, sewage chlorination, required by environmental regulations, was identified as a major negative factor for aquatic life. Although disinfection theoretically reduced the chances of hypothetical bathers contracting disease downstream of a sewage outfall, chlorination also killed most aquatic life for miles downstream. Late in the 1980s, the Sanitary District was allowed to discontinue chlorination. Fish soon returned to the Boneyard, after the chlorine block was removed from the Saline Branch. The fish, however, live a tenuous life on the Boneyard, which has frequently seen major fish kills as a result of spills and other accidents in the urbanized area.

One branch of the Boneyard extends into South Neil Street, where it meets the headwaters of the Embarrass and Kaskaskia rivers. During the 1920s, the Illinois Central Railroad tracks were elevated in this area, to allow traffic to pass under the tracks. The rail embankment cut off the South Neil branch of the Boneyard, creating "Lake Neil" after a moderate rain event. This flooding would subside over several hours as the water flowed under the rail embankment through tiles.

The City of Champaign, in cooperation with the University of Illinois, has set up a master plan for improving the creek's watershed.

During the 1980s, "Lake Neil" was eliminated by placing larger tiles under the rail embankment. This, however, had the effect of creating flooding on the other side of the tracks, near Fourth and Green, where the branches of the Boneyard joined. In wet years, flooding caused damage estimated to be as much as $1,000 per year.

During the late 1990s, the City of Champaign resolved to eliminate the flooding near Fourth Street and Green Street. After considerable debate, the city built an enormous detention basin upstream of Fourth and Green streets, at a cost of approximately $22 million. The basin is designed to fill when the Boneyard approaches flood stage, preventing flooding at Fourth and Green streets up to a 100-year flood.

== Coordinates ==
- 40.112°N 88.236°W - Scott Park, Champaign
- 40.111°N 88.227°W - UIUC Engineering campus, Urbana
- 40.113°N 88.215°W - Patterson Parklet, Urbana

== Boneyard Greenway ==
The Boneyard Greenway is a pedestrian and bike path that runs along the length of the Boneyard Creek from S 1st St to S 6th St. This path is used primarily by UIUC students, faculty, and local residents to navigate campus away from the busy sidewalks and streets of the main roads.

== See also ==
- List of Illinois rivers
