= Society of Hispanic Professional Engineers =

- Formation: 1974
- Type: Engineering Society
- Headquarters: Los Angeles, California
- Region served: International
- Website: shpe.org

The Society of Hispanic Professional Engineers (SHPE) was founded in Los Angeles, California in 1974 by a group of engineers employed by the city of Los Angeles. Their objective was to form a National organization of professional engineers to serve as role models in the Latino community.

Social Networking was the key basis for the organization, as SHPE quickly established two student chapters to begin the network that would grow to encompass the nation and reach countries outside the United States. Currently, there are close to 300 chapters across the United States that are part of SHPE's network.

On June 1, 2017, SHPE announced Raquel Tamez would join the organization as Chief Executive Officer. One month later, Miguel Alemañy was announced as the new Chair of the National Board of Directors.

Along with AISES, NSBE, and SWE, SHPE is a founding member of the 50K Coalition, the collaborative is made up of more than 40 organizations with theinitial objective of producing 50,000 diverse engineering graduates every year by the year 2025. In addition to SHPE, the organisation is also a member of the STEM Education Coalition, which raises public awareness about the critical role that STEM education plays in enabling the United States to remain the economic and technological leader of the global marketplace for years to come.

== Programs ==
Volunteer leaders serve in leadership roles within SHPE's regions and chapters, which deliver SHPE's core programs. In addition to raising awareness of STEM and increasing access to it among Hispanic and Latino communities, SHPE's programs serve K-12, undergraduate, graduate students, as well as academic and industry professionals. SHPE offers the following individual programs in addition to its overall leadership development framework (SHPEology) for undergraduates, graduate students, and working professionals.

- SHPE Academics: Supports the journey of those in academia
- SHPE Professionals: Offers leadership strategies that make a positive workplace impact
- SHPE Technology & Innovation: Shines a spotlight on the latest technology and innovation in STEM
- SHPE K-12: Offers student-focused programs to get young people excited about STEM
- MentorSHPE: Provides a platform for members to build lasting relationships with other members
- Noche de Ciencias: Family science night events promoting STEM awareness to K-12 students
- ScholarSHPE: Offers students financial support to narrow the gap in the Hispanic and Latino STEM education pipeline
- SHPEology: Designed to raise awareness about the importance of Hispanic and Latino inclusion in STEM
- SHPEtina: Empowering Latinas in STEM offers strategies to thrive and overcome obstacles

== Events ==
SHPE also maintains a strong network by hosting three annual events offering leadership skills training and networking opportunities for its membership and supporters. These events include:

- National Convention. As the organization's signature event, this is the largest technical and career conference for Hispanics and Latinos in the United States, attracting over 6,000 engineering professionals, students, and corporate representatives. The conference features educational and technical panel discussions and workshops for its professional and student attendees. In addition, companies recruit talent for jobs and internships via a Career Fair Expo, as well as support competitions that allow undergraduate and graduate students the opportunity to showcase their talents. There are specialized programs available for pre-college students, prospective graduate students, and academic and engineering professionals, as well as a Distinguished Lecture Series led by STEM academics.
- National Institute for Leadership Advancement (NILA). This conference convenes newly elected chapter leaders from SHPE's undergraduate and professional chapters, offering leadership, community engagement, and mentorship skills training through workshops, lectures, individual and team exercises, hands-on activities, and small group breakout sessions. All attendees receive the Certified Chapter Leader certificate upon program completion.
- Regional Leadership Development Conference (RLDC). These conferences, which are held in all seven of SHPE's regions at a university, convene members of a region's student chapters to improve their organizational, managerial, and technical skills. There is a focus on developing and improving chapters’ K-12 outreach programs, chapter infrastructure improvement, and corporate network strengthening.

At the organization's national convention, SHPE annually presents the STAR awards, a variety of honors given to individuals and organizations that have contributed significantly to support Hispanics and Latinos in STEM.

== Industry Partnership Council ==
Composed of national companies and government agencies committed to diversity and inclusion, SHPE's Industry Partnership Council (IPC) supports year-round programming, shares industry perspectives, provides resources and development tools, and invests in recruitment and retention for SHPE chapters. There are more than 45 IPC members.

== Regions ==
SHPE is a national organization and is divided into seven regions as the picture below shows.

Region	States
1	AK, Northern NV, Northern CA, OR, WA
2	AZ, HI, Southern CA, Southern NV
3	CO, ID, KS, NE, NM, ND, MT, SD, UT, WY
4	CT, DE, ME, MD, MA, NH, NJ, NY, PA, RI, VT, VA, WV, PR
5	AL, AR, LA, MS, OK, TN, TX
6	IL, IN, IA, KY, MI, MN, MO, OH, WI
7	NC, SC, GA, FL
