= The Lesser Evil =

The Lesser Evil or Lesser Evil may refer to:

== Films ==
- The Lesser Evil (1912 film), a 1912 silent film
- The Lesser Evil (1998 film), a 1998 drama film
- The Lesser Evil (2007 film), a 2007 black comedy thriller film

== Literature ==
- The Lesser Evil, a 1988 book by Lenni Brenner
- "The Lesser Evil", a short story by Andrzej Sapkowski in the 1993 collection The Last Wish
- The Lesser Evil: Political Ethics in an Age of Terror, a 2005 book by Michael Ignatieff
- Star Wars: Thrawn Ascendancy: Lesser Evil (2021), the third novel in a Star Wars trilogy

== Other ==
- "Lesser Evil" (Burn Notice), a 2009 television episode
- "Lesser Evils" (Elementary), a 2012 television episode
- LesserEvil, an organic snack company located in Danbury, Connecticut

== See also ==
- Lesser of two evils principle
- "The Lesser of Two Evils", an episode of Futurama
- LessWrong
