= Valery Martynov =

Soviet double agent (died 1987)

- Died: May 28, 1987; Moscow, USSR
- Cause of death: Execution
- Citizenship: Soviet Union
- Occupations: KGB operative, double agent
- Relatives: Edward Coristine (grandson)
- Motive: Financial gain
- Criminal charges: Espionage
- Penalty: Execution

Valery Martynov (Russian: Валерий Мартынов) was a Soviet double agent working as a KGB officer as well as an intelligence asset for the United States. While serving as a lieutenant colonel in the KGB, he was stationed in 1980 at the Soviet official offices in Washington, D.C. By 1982, he had become a double agent and was passing intelligence to the CIA and FBI under the code name "Gentile". He was executed in Moscow on May 28, 1987, at the age of 41.

== Early career and recruitment ==
Martynov was a lieutenant colonel in the KGB who worked for the First Chief Directorate, responsible for foreign intelligence. He and his wife Natalia arrived in Washington in November 1980, he under the guise as third secretary of the Soviet embassy. He was recruited in 1982 by an FBI-CIA program, and started to feed information to US intelligence.

== Contributions to US intelligence ==
Martynov provided detailed information about KGB operations, including the identities of Soviet spies operating within the United States and the strategies the KGB employed to recruit and manage agents. His intelligence helped the FBI and CIA identify and neutralize Soviet spies, making him one of the most valuable double agents of his time. He revealed the identities of fifty Soviet intelligence officers operating from the embassy, along with technical and scientific targets that the KGB had penetrated.

== Betrayal and execution ==
Despite the intelligence he provided, Martynov's fate was sealed when Aldrich Ames, a CIA officer who had turned into an informant for the Soviet Union, betrayed him. Ames, motivated by financial gain and possibly a deep sense of resentment toward his agency, provided the KGB with the names of numerous American spies and assets, including Martynov.

Moscow was informed in 1985 that two KGB officers at the Soviet Embassy in Washington were secretly working for the United States.

According to The New York Times:

[Soviet counterintelligence officer Vitaliy] Yurchenko, unhappy with his lot as a defector [after coming over to the Americans in August 1985], suddenly redefected back to the Soviet Union in early November [1985, still]. Mr. Cherkashin has said in a previous interview that Mr. Yurchenko's redefection presented an opportunity to lure Valeriy Martynov, a KGB officer in the Washington station working for the FBI, back to the Soviet Union: The KGB arranged for Mr. Martynov to serve as a member of an honor guard escorting Mr. Yurchenko back to Moscow. When they arrived back in the Soviet Union, it was Mr. Martynov who was arrested; Mr. Yurchenko was given a job at the KGB again.

— New York Times

Martynov was subsequently executed in 1987.

His wife, Natalia, returned to the United States in 1995 with their two children: Alexander, who became a Virginia police officer, and Anna, who became a financial professional and married Charles Coristine, the owner of LesserEvil. His grandson, Edward "Big Balls" Coristine, was hired by DOGE at the age of 19 in 2025.
