= He Didn't Come Back For You =

Canadian political catchphrase

"He Didn't Come Back For You" was a phrase used by the Conservative Party of Canada against Liberal Party of Canada leader Michael Ignatieff during the 2011 Canadian federal election. It has been noted as one of the key points of the 2011 election, contributing to the Liberal Party's failure not only to win the election, but to their collapse during the election, as they were relegated to third party status for the first time in history.

== Background ==
Born and raised in Canada, Ignatieff had moved to the United Kingdom in 1978 for a senior research fellowship at King's College, Cambridge. He then went on to hold a number of university positions in Europe for the next two decades, also being noted as a broadcaster on radio and television. In 2000, he left the UK to move to the United States, taking a position as the director of the Carr Center for Human Rights Policy at the John F. Kennedy School of Government at Harvard University. In 2005, he left Harvard to return to Canada, taking a position at the University of Toronto. In November of that year, he announced that he would run in the 2006 Canadian federal election, seeking the Liberal Party of Canada nomination in the Toronto riding of Etobicoke—Lakeshore.

Ignatieff was elected to his seat, however the Liberal Party lost the election, being replaced in government by Stephen Harper's Conservative Party of Canada. After receiving several high-profile endorsements, Ignatieff ran in the 2006 Liberal Party of Canada leadership election, eventually finishing in second behind Stéphane Dion. The Liberal Party, however, continued to decline, receiving only 26% of the vote in the 2008 Canadian federal election. Ignatieff then ran as the only candidate in the 2009 Liberal Party of Canada leadership election and was named Liberal leader in May 2009.

== Attack ads ==
In the lead up to and during the 2011 Canadian federal election, the Conservative Party of Canada ran a series of attack ads against the Liberal Party, targeting Ignatieff in particular. The ads attempted to paint Ignatieff as an opportunistic politician who had only returned to Canada because he thought he could become prime minister. The ads prominently featured taglines such as "Just visiting," "Just in it for himself," and, most notoriously, "He Didn't Come Back For You."

In an attempt to dispel the attacks, the Liberal Party initially released a series of ads where Ignatieff spoke of his family as Russian refugees who had arrived in Canada and built up their lives. However, the Conservative Party attacked those ads as well, claiming that Ignatieff's background was not a typical experience for Canadian immigrants, as his family had been part of the Russian aristocracy prior to the Russian Revolution, with his grandfather Paul Ignatieff having been a minister under Tsar Nicholas II.

The 2011 election was held on 2 May, resulting in the Conservative Party remaining in power, increasing its seat count from a minority to a majority government, while the Liberal Party won the fewest seats in its history. Ignatieff was defeated by Conservative Bernard Trottier in his own riding.

== Legacy ==
The use of the phrase was criticised by some as an attempt to gatekeep Canadian citizenship, that the phrase disseminated the notion that true Canadians were only those that spent their entire lives in Canada. Some critics of the phrase noted that many distinguished Canadians had spent portions of their life outside of the country without being deemed as less Canadian, such as hockey stars who played for American NHL teams.

After the election, Ignatieff returned to his position at the University of Toronto, eventually splitting his time between Toronto and Harvard before returning to Harvard full-time in 2014. In 2016, he was named the fifth president and rector of the Central European University (CEU) in Budapest, Hungary. In 2013, he said of the attack ads that "it was a little painful to be told I didn't really belong in my own country, that I was just visiting in my own country. I'll be frank, it hurt."

The phrase saw a brief resurgence in Canadian politics in 2017, being used against Kevin O'Leary in his ultimately unsuccessful bid in the 2017 Conservative Party of Canada leadership election.
