= Charlie Johnson in the Flames =

2003 novel by Michael Ignatieff

- Author: Michael Ignatieff
- Language: English
- Publisher: Grove Press
- Publication date: October 2003
- Publication place: Canada & United States
- Media type: Print
- Pages: 179
- ISBN: 978-0-670-04431-3
- OCLC: 52496182

Charlie Johnson in the Flames is the third novel by Canadian academic Michael Ignatieff. The book follows the story of journalist Charlie Johnson who, while covering ethnic violence in the Balkans, witnesses a woman purposely set on fire by a Serbian officer. The event haunts Charlie Johnson who tracks down the officer in an attempt to discover how he could rationalize such an action. Since its publication in October 2003, it has been analysed in several literature journals. It was met with reviews that found the book to be a satisfying thriller but with uneven pacing.

== Background ==
At the time of publication, author Michael Ignatieff was 56 years old and the director of the Carr Center for Human Rights Policy at Harvard University. He had previously written numerous non-fiction books, including Empire Lite: Nation-Building in Bosnia, Kosovo and Afghanistan and The Lesser Evil - Political Ethics in an Age of Terror (for the Gifford Lectures) which were both published in 2003 along with Charlie Johnson in the Flames. Ignatieff had written two previous novels, Asya in 1991 and Scar Tissue in 1993, which was short-listed for the Man Booker Prize.

== Synopsis ==
American reporter Charlie Johnson and his Polish cameraman Jacek investigate violence taking place in Kosovo. While in Serb-occupied territory, where there has been significant guerilla fighting, they hide in a house belonging to a Muslim family. They witness a Serb patrol unit destroy a house and light a fleeing woman on fire. A horrified Charlie attempts to assist the woman but she dies at an American field hospital. The event haunts Charlie, even after he returns to his family in England. In an attempt to understand how someone could justify such actions, Charlie tracks down the officer responsible to ask him why he did what he did.

== Style and themes ==
The book uses parallels and symbols to portray Charlie as a martyr who sacrifices in order to be in a position to communicate to the world the events that are occurring in war zones. Bronwyn Drainie links the fire imagery to "iconographic figures like St. Peter in Chains, the Madonna in Glory, or Susanna Among the Elders". Drainie also notes that "the novel is full of the vocabulary of purification and redemption". An article in the journal English Studies compared the characterizations of war correspondents in Ignatieff's Charlie Johnson in the Flames and Pat Barker's Double Vision, both of whom report on violence to "image-dominated cultures" and deal with debates regarding intervention. Likewise, an article in the New York Times Book Review compared fictional portrayals war correspondents in Alan Cowell's A Walking Guide and Gil Courtemanche's A Sunday at the Pool in Kigali with Ignatieff's Charlie Johnson. While Ignatieff does address the debate on intervention on foreign affairs, and its moral implication, he was quoted as saying that he was not trying to make a point, "In fiction, there is no message. The book is about Charlie and what happens to him. It's driven by the plot, not by any ideas that I might have."

== Publication and reception ==
In the Library Journal review, HM comments that it has the "rapid-fire pacing of a modern thriller and the escalating emotions of Graham Greene's best" and writes, "Readers will be hooked from the get-go and wish that Charlie's odyssey weren't quite so short. A fine complement to the author's nonfiction works—and a shoo-in for book groups—this is highly recommended for all collections." The review in The Economist commented on the books uneven pace, concluding, "The fine writing and potential for interesting development that the novel's early sections promise burn out all too quickly." The Entertainment Weekly reviewer gave it an "A Minus" and wrote that "Ignatieff never rushes, making his deliberate, philosophical way from the adrenaline-surged first chapter to the chilling, poignant conclusion". In Kirkus Reviews, the book was said to exhibit a "bold, slashing view of the tiresome banality of evil" but criticized the use of "clichéd characters". Critic Donna Seaman wrote, in Booklist, that the story was "surgically honed, emotionally scorching, and powerfully resonant tale". In Publishers Weekly, the review said, "This is a readable but standard tale of redemption and revenge, one that would have benefited from the layers of psychological and political insight that Ignatieff brings to the rest of his work." In Quill & Quire, Bronwyn Drainie wrote that, despite some flaws, "the book is a gripping short read, largely due to Ignatieff's sharp eye for detail and his sinewy, journalistic prose. Novels don't necessarily have to be completely convincing to be entertaining".
