= Empire lite =

Empire lite is a form of imperialism in which major powers shape world affairs using diplomacy and short-term military intervention rather than conquest, colonialism or direct governance of other countries. It differs from classical imperialism in two ways: it involves a much smaller commitment of resources, and it does not involve new settlement by the imperial power.

The term was first popularized by Canadian author and politician Michael Ignatieff in his book Empire Lite: Nation-Building in Bosnia, Kosovo and Afghanistan. In this and other writings, Ignatieff identifies the author of empire lite as the United States, the world's last military superpower. The purpose of empire lite, Ignatieff believes, is to build a global "humanitarian empire" of free, self-governing countries through long-term nation building — including the use of military force — in failed or failing states.

Ignatieff supported the U.S. invasion of Iraq in 2003 because he saw it as one such intervention, a step he later regretted.

== See also ==
- American imperialism
- Empire
- Imperialism
- Responsibility to protect
- New World Order

== Bibliography ==
- Michael Ignatieff, Empire Lite: Nation-Building in Bosnia, Kosovo and Afghanistan
- Michael Ignatieff, "America's Empire is an Empire Lite," New York Times Magazine, Jan. 10, 2003.
