= Michael Ignatieff =

Canadian author, academic and former politician (born 1947)

The Honourable Michael Ignatieff PC CM
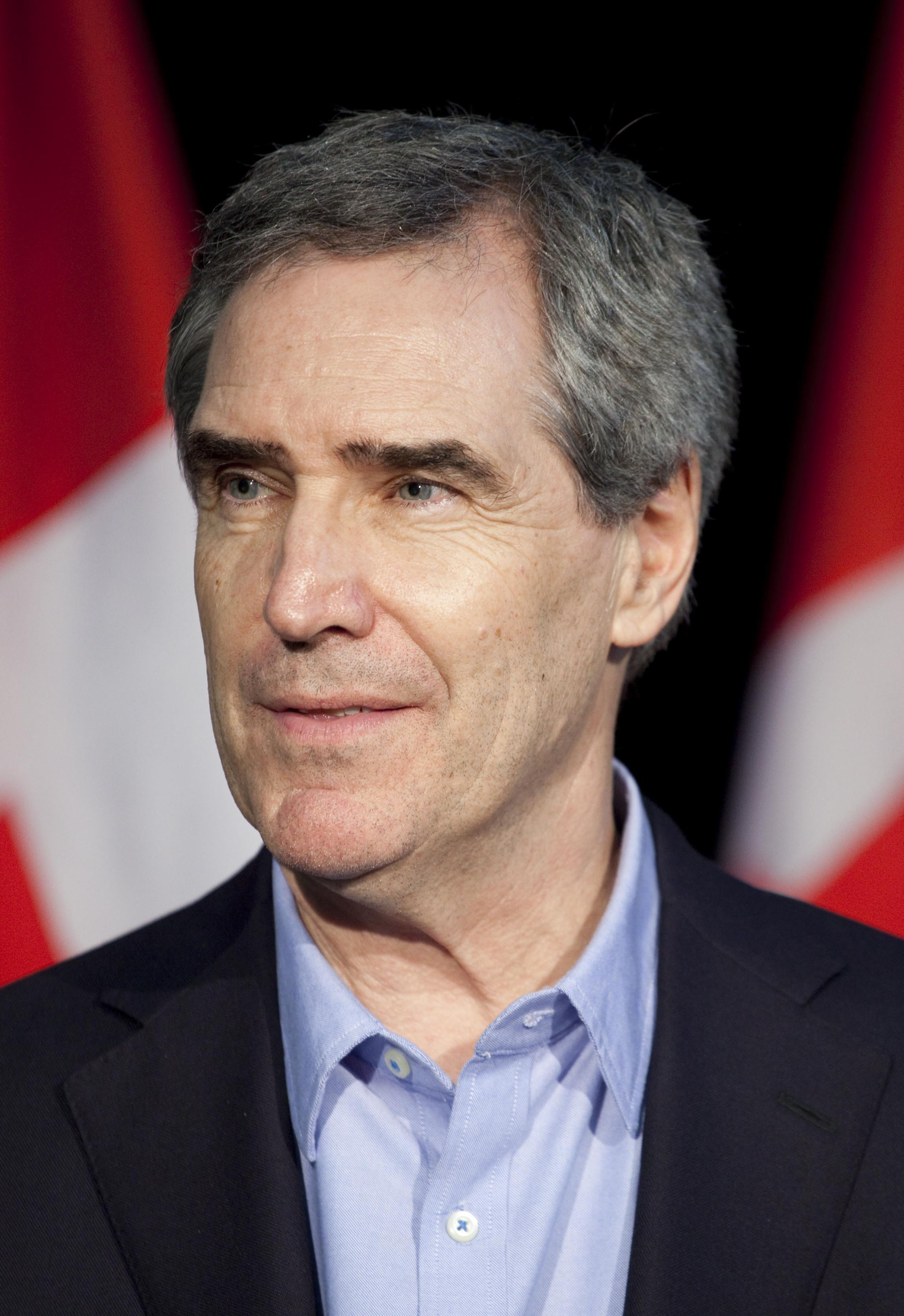
- Ignatieff in 2011

President and Rector of Central European University
- In office September 1, 2016 – July 1, 2021
- Preceded by: John Shattuck
- Succeeded by: Shalini Randeria

Leader of the Opposition
- In office December 10, 2008 – May 2, 2011
- Monarch: Elizabeth II
- Prime Minister: Stephen Harper
- Preceded by: Stéphane Dion
- Succeeded by: Jack Layton

Leader of the Liberal Party
- In office May 2, 2009 – May 25, 2011 (Note: Interim: December 10, 2008 – May 2, 2009)
- Deputy: Ralph Goodale (2010–2011)
- Preceded by: Stéphane Dion
- Succeeded by: Justin Trudeau (Note: Bob Rae served as interim leader from May 25, 2011 to April 14, 2013.)

Deputy Leader of the Liberal Party
- In office December 2, 2006 – November 13, 2008
- Leader: Stéphane Dion
- Preceded by: Sheila Copps (Note: Position vacant between November 4, 1993 and December 2, 2006.)
- Succeeded by: Ralph Goodale (Note: Position vacant between November 13, 2008 and September 7, 2010.)

Member of Parliament for Etobicoke–Lakeshore
- In office January 23, 2006 – May 2, 2011
- Preceded by: Jean Augustine
- Succeeded by: Bernard Trottier

Personal details
- Born: May 12, 1947 (age 79) Toronto, Ontario, Canada
- Party: Liberal
- Spouses: Susan Barrowclough (m. 1977; div. 1997) Zsuzsanna Zsohar (m. 1999)
- Children: 2
- Parent: George Ignatieff (father)
- Relatives: Nikolay Pavlovich Ignatyev (paternal great-grandfather); Paul Ignatieff (parernal grandfather)
- Education: University of Toronto (BA); University of Oxford; Harvard University (PhD)
- Website: Official website

Michael Grant Ignatieff PC CM (/ɪɡˈnætiɛf/ ig-NAT-ee-ef; born May 12, 1947) is a Canadian author, academic and former politician who served as leader of the Liberal Party and leader of the Opposition from 2008 until 2011. Known for his work as a historian, Ignatieff has held senior academic posts at the universities of Cambridge, Oxford, Harvard, and Toronto. Most recently, he was rector and president of Central European University; he held this position from 2016 to 2021.

While living in the United Kingdom from 1978 to 2000, Ignatieff became well known as a television and radio broadcaster and as an editorial columnist for The Observer. His documentary series Blood and Belonging: Journeys into the New Nationalism aired on BBC in 1993, and won a Canadian Gemini Award. His book of the same name, based on the series, won the Gordon Montador Award for Best Canadian Book on Social Issues and the University of Toronto's Lionel Gelber Prize. His memoir, The Russian Album, won Canada's Governor General's Literary Award and the British Royal Society of Literature's Heinemann Prize in 1988. His novel, Scar Tissue, was short-listed for the Booker Prize in 1994. In 2000, he delivered the Massey Lectures, entitled The Rights Revolution, which was released in print later that year.

In the 2006 federal election, Ignatieff was elected to the House of Commons as the member of Parliament (MP) for Etobicoke—Lakeshore. The same year, he ran for the leadership of the Liberal Party, ultimately losing to Stéphane Dion. He served as the party's deputy leader under Dion. After Dion's resignation in the wake of the 2008 election, Ignatieff served as interim leader from December 2008 until he was elected leader at the party's May 2009 convention. In the 2011 federal election, Ignatieff lost his own seat in the Liberal Party's worst showing in its history. Winning only 34 seats, the party placed a distant third behind the Conservatives and NDP, and thus lost its position as the Official Opposition. Ignatieff subsequently resigned as leader of the Liberal Party, and in effect retired from active politics, in May 2011.

Ignatieff taught at the University of Toronto after his 2011 electoral defeat. In 2013, he returned to Harvard Kennedy School part-time, splitting his time between Harvard and Toronto. On July 1, 2014, he returned to Harvard full-time. In 2016, he left Harvard to become president and rector of the Central European University in Budapest; he resigned from this position in July 2021. He continues to publish articles and essays on international affairs as well as Canadian politics. In 2024, he was awarded the Princess of Asturias Award for Social Sciences.

== Life and education ==
Ignatieff was born on May 12, 1947, in Toronto, the elder son of Russian-born Canadian Rhodes Scholar and diplomat George Ignatieff, and his Canadian-born wife, Jessie Alison (née Grant). Ignatieff was named after Lester "Mike" Pearson, a close friend of his parents. Ignatieff's family moved abroad frequently in his early childhood as his father rose in the diplomatic ranks.

At the age of 11, in 1959, Ignatieff was sent back to Toronto to attend Upper Canada College as a boarder. At UCC, he was elected a school prefect as head of Wedd's House, was the captain of the varsity soccer team, and served as editor-in-chief of the school's yearbook. As well, Ignatieff volunteered for the Liberal Party during the 1965 federal election by canvassing the riding of York South. He resumed his work for the Liberal Party in 1968, as a national youth organizer and delegate for Pierre Trudeau's leadership campaign.

After high school, Ignatieff studied history at the University of Toronto's Trinity College (B.A., 1969). There, he met fellow student Bob Rae, from University College, who was a debating opponent and fourth-year roommate. After completing his undergraduate degree, Ignatieff took up his studies at the University of Oxford, where he studied under, and was influenced by, the liberal philosopher Sir Isaiah Berlin, whom he would later write about. While an undergraduate at the University of Toronto, he was a part-time reporter for The Globe and Mail in 1964–65. In 1976, Ignatieff completed his Ph.D. in history at Harvard University. He was granted a Cambridge M.A. by incorporation in 1978 on taking up a fellowship at King's College there.

=== Family ===
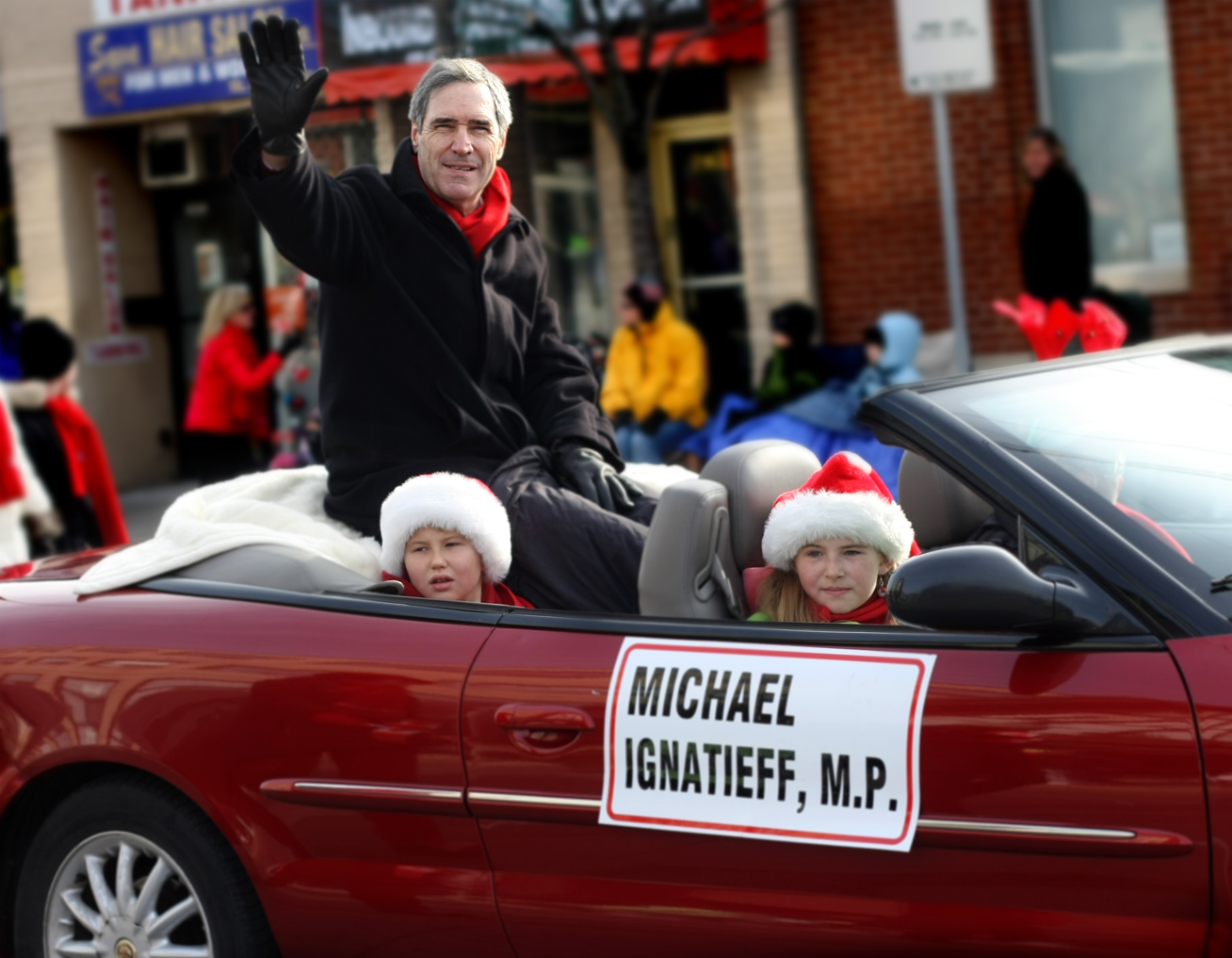
Ignatieff at the Lakeshore Santa Claus Parade, December 5, 2009

Ignatieff's paternal grandfather was Count Paul Ignatieff, the Russian minister of education during the First World War and son of Count Nikolay Pavlovich Ignatyev, an important Russian statesman and diplomat. His mother's grandfathers were George Monro Grant and Sir George Robert Parkin, and her younger brother was the Canadian Conservative political philosopher George Grant (1918–1988), author of Lament for a Nation. His great-aunt Alice Parkin Massey was the wife of Canada's first native-born Governor General, Vincent Massey. His first cousin Caroline Andrew was a political scientist. He is also a descendant of William Lawson, the first president of the Bank of Nova Scotia.

Ignatieff is married to Hungarian-born Zsuzsanna M. Zsohar and has two children, Theo and Sophie, from his first marriage to Londoner Susan Barrowclough. He also has a younger brother, Andrew, a community worker who assisted with Ignatieff's campaign.

Although he says he is not religious, Ignatieff was raised Russian Orthodox and occasionally attends services with family. He describes himself as neither an atheist nor a "believer".

== Early career ==
Ignatieff was an assistant professor of history at the University of British Columbia from 1976 to 1978. In 1978 he moved to the United Kingdom, where he held a senior research fellowship at King's College, Cambridge, until 1984. He then left Cambridge for London, where he began to focus on his career as a writer and journalist. His book The Russian Album documented a history of his family's experiences in nineteenth-century Russia (and subsequent exile), and won the 1987 Governor General's Award for Non-Fiction and the British Royal Society of Literature's Heinemann Prize in Canada.

During this time, he travelled extensively. He also continued to lecture at universities in Europe and North America, and held teaching posts at Oxford, the University of London, the London School of Economics, the University of California and in France. While living in Britain, Ignatieff became well known as a broadcaster on radio and television. His best-known television work has been Voices on Channel 4, the BBC 2 discussion programme Thinking Aloud and BBC 2's arts programme, The Late Show. He was also an editorial columnist for The Observer from 1990 to 1993.

His documentary series Blood and Belonging: Journeys into the New Nationalism aired on BBC in 1993, winning a Canadian Gemini Award. He later adapted this series into a book, Blood and Belonging: Journeys into the New Nationalism, detailing the dangers of ethnic nationalism in the post-Cold War period. Ignatieff instead championed the cause of civic nationalism based on "a community of equal, rights-bearing citizens, united in patriotic attachment to a shared set of political practices and values." This book won the Gordon Montador Award for Best Canadian Book on Social Issues and the University of Toronto's Lionel Gelber Prize. Ignatieff also wrote the novel, Scar Tissue, which was shortlisted for the Booker Prize in 1994.

In 1998, he was on the first panel of the long-running BBC Radio discussion series In Our Time. Around this time, his 1998 biography of Isaiah Berlin was shortlisted for both the Jewish Quarterly Literary Prize for Non-Fiction and the James Tait Black Memorial Prize.

=== Human rights policy ===
In 2000, Ignatieff accepted a position as the director of the Carr Center for Human Rights Policy at the Harvard Kennedy School at Harvard University. Ignatieff's influence on policy continued to grow, helping to prepare the report The Responsibility to Protect for the International Commission on Intervention and State Sovereignty with Gareth Evans. This report examined the role of international involvement in Kosovo and Rwanda, and advocated a framework for 'humanitarian' intervention in future humanitarian crises. He delivered the Massey Lectures in 2000, entitled The Rights Revolution, which was released in print later that year. He would eventually become a participant and panel leader at the World Economic Forum in Geneva.

2001 marked the September 11 attacks in the United States, renewing academic interest in issues of foreign policy and nation building. Ignatieff's text on Western interventionist policies and nation building, Virtual War: Kosovo and Beyond, won the Orwell Prize for political non-fiction in 2001. As a journalist, Ignatieff observed that the United States had established "an empire lite, a global hegemony whose grace notes are free markets, human rights and democracy, enforced by the most awesome military power the world has ever known." This became the subject of his 2003 book Empire Lite: Nation-Building in Bosnia, Kosovo and Afghanistan, which argued that America had a responsibility to create a "humanitarian empire" through nation-building and, if necessary, military force. This would become a frequent topic in his lectures. At the Amnesty 2005 Lecture in Dublin, he offered evidence to show that "we wouldn't have international human rights without the leadership of the United States".

Ignatieff's interventionist approach led him to support the 2003 Invasion of Iraq. According to Ignatieff, the United States had a duty to expend itself unseating Iraqi president Saddam Hussein in the interests of international security and human rights. Ignatieff initially accepted the argument of George W. Bush administration that containment through sanctions and threats would not prevent Hussein from selling weapons of mass destruction to international terrorists. Ignatieff wrongly believed that those weapons were still being developed in Iraq.

In 2004, he published The Lesser Evil: Political Ethics in an Age of Terror, a philosophical work analyzing human rights in the post-9/11 world. Ignatieff argued that there may be circumstances where indefinite detention or coercive interrogations may have to be used on terror suspects to combat terrorism. Democratic institutions would need to evolve to protect human rights, finding a way to keep these necessary evils from offending democracy as much as the evils they are meant to prevent. The book attracted considerable attention. It was a finalist for the Lionel Gelber Prize but also earned him some criticism. In 2005, he was criticized by his peers on the editorial board of the Index on Censorship, where human rights advocate Conor Gearty said Ignatieff fell into a category of "hand-wringing, apologetic apologists for human-rights abuses". Ignatieff responded by resigning from the editorial board of the Index,; he has maintained that he supports a complete ban on torture.

By 2005, Ignatieff's writings on human rights and foreign affairs earned him the 37th rank on a list of most influential public intellectuals prepared by Prospect and Foreign Policy magazines.

=== Return to Canadian academe ===
Around 2005, Ignatieff became more frequently mentioned as a possible Liberal candidate for the next federal election, and rumours swirled about the beginnings of a political career. At this time, he left Harvard to become the Chancellor Jackman Professor in Human Rights Policy at the University of Toronto and a Distinguished Senior Fellow of the university's Munk School of Global Affairs and Public Policy.

He continued to write about the subject of Iraq, reiterating his support, if not the method in which it was conducted. According to Ignatieff, "what Saddam Hussein had done to the Kurds and the Shia" in Iraq was sufficient justification for the invasion. His support for the war began to wane as time passed; he said: "I supported an administration whose intentions I didn't trust, believing that the consequences would repay the gamble. Now I realize that intentions do shape consequences." He eventually recanted his support for the war entirely. In a 2007 New York Times Magazine article, he wrote: "The unfolding catastrophe in Iraq has condemned the political judgment of a president, but it has also condemned the judgment of many others, myself included, who as commentators supported the invasion." Ignatieff partly interpreted what he now saw as his particular errors of judgment, by presenting them as typical of academics and intellectuals in general, whom he characterized as "generalizing and interpreting particular facts as instances of some big idea". In politics, by contrast, "Specifics matter more than generalities". Samuel Moyn, Harvard University historian of human rights and humanitarian intervention, asserts that Ignatieff is among those whose who "soiled their reputations" through their defence of the Iraq war, and labelled his later public apology "embarrassingly vacuous."

=== Writings ===
Ignatieff is a historian, a fiction writer and public intellectual who has written several books on international relations and nation building. He has written seventeen books, and has been described by the British Arts Council as "an extraordinarily versatile writer", in both the style and the subjects he writes about. He has contributed articles to publications including The Globe and Mail, The New Republic, and The New York Times Magazine. Maclean's named him among the "Top 10 Canadian Who's Who" in 1997 and one of the "50 Most Influential Canadians Shaping Society" in 2002. In 2003, Maclean's named him Canada's "Sexiest Cerebral Man".

==== Fictional works ====
His fictional works, Asya, Scar Tissue, and Charlie Johnson in the Flames cover, respectively, the life and travels of a Russian girl, the disintegration of one's mother due to neurological disease, and the haunting memories of a journalist in Kosovo. The works are to some extent autobiographical; for instance, Ignatieff travelled to the Balkans and Kurdistan while working as a journalist, witnessing first hand the consequences of modern ethnic warfare.

==== Historian and biographer ====
A historian by training, he wrote A Just Measure of Pain, a history of prisons during the Industrial Revolution. His biography of Isaiah Berlin reveals the strong impression the celebrated philosopher made on Ignatieff. Philosophical writings by Ignatieff include The Needs of Strangers and The Rights Revolution. The latter work explores social welfare and community, and shows Berlin's influence on Ignatieff. These tie closely to Ignatieff's political writings on national self-determination and the imperatives of democratic self-government. Ignatieff has also written extensively on international affairs. His historical memoir, The Russian Album, traces his family's life in Russia and their troubles and subsequent emigration as a result of the Bolshevik Revolution.

==== Canadian studies ====
In The Rights Revolution, Ignatieff identifies three aspects of Canada's approach to human rights that give the country its distinctive culture: 1) On moral issues, Canadian law is secular and liberal, approximating European standards more closely than American ones; 2) Canadian political culture is social democratic, and Canadians take it for granted that citizens have the right to free health care and public assistance; 3) Canadians place a particular emphasis on group rights, expressed in Quebec's language laws and in treaty agreements that recognize collective aboriginal rights. "Apart from New Zealand, no other country has given such recognition to the idea of group rights", he writes.

Ignatieff states that despite its admirable commitment to equality and group rights, Canadian society still places an unjust burden on women and gays and lesbians, and he says it is still difficult for newcomers of non-British or French descent to form an enduring sense of citizenship. He attributes this to the "patch-work quilt of distinctive societies", emphasizing that civic bonds will only be easier when the understanding of Canada as a multinational community is more widely shared.

==== International studies ====
Ignatieff has written extensively on international development, peacekeeping and the international responsibilities of Western nations. Blood and Belonging, a 1993 work, explores the duality of nationalism, from Yugoslavia to Northern Ireland. It is the first of a trilogy of books that explore modern conflicts. The Warrior's Honour, published in 1998, deals with ethnically motivated conflicts, including the conflicts in Afghanistan and Rwanda. The final book, Virtual War, describes the problems of modern peacekeeping, with special reference to the NATO presence in Kosovo.

His 2003 book Empire Lite attracted considerable attention for suggesting that America, the world's last remaining superpower, should create a "humanitarian empire". This book continued his criticism of the limited-risk approach practiced by NATO in conflicts like the Kosovo War and the Rwandan genocide. Ignatieff became an advocate for more active involvement and larger scale deployment of land forces by Western nations in future conflicts in the developing world. Ignatieff was originally a prominent supporter of the 2003 Invasion of Iraq. However, Ignatieff attempts to distinguish the empire lite approach from neo-conservativism because the motives of the foreign engagement he advocates are essentially altruistic rather than self-serving.

Ignatieff's 2004 book The Lesser Evil: Political Ethics in an Age of Terror, argued that Western democracies may have to resort to "lesser evils" like indefinite detention of suspects, coercive interrogations, assassinations, and pre-emptive wars in order to combat the greater evil of terrorism. He states that as a result, societies should strengthen their democratic institutions to keep these necessary evils from becoming as offensive to freedom and democracy as the threats they are meant to prevent. The 'Lesser Evil' approach has been criticized by some prominent human rights advocates, like Conor Gearty, for incorporating a problematic form of moral language that can be used to legitimize forms of torture. But other human rights advocates, like Human Rights Watch's Kenneth Roth, have defended Ignatieff, saying his work "cannot fairly be equated with support for torture or 'torture lite'." In the context of this "lesser evil" analysis, Ignatieff has discussed whether or not liberal democracies should employ coercive interrogation and torture. Ignatieff has adamantly maintained that he supports a complete ban on torture. His definition of torture, according to his 2004 Op-ed in The New York Times, does not include "forms of sleep deprivation that do not result in lasting harm to mental or physical health, together with disinformation and disorientation (like keeping prisoners in hoods)."

== Political career ==
In 2004, three Liberal organizers, former Liberal candidate Alfred Apps, Ian Davey (son of Senator Keith Davey) and lawyer Daniel Brock, travelled to Cambridge, Massachusetts, to convince Ignatieff to move back to Canada and run for the House of Commons of Canada, and to consider a possible bid for the Liberal leadership should Paul Martin retire. Rocco Rossi, who was at that time a key Liberal Party organizer, had previously mentioned to Davey that Davey's father had said that Ignatieff had "the makings of a prime minister". In January 2005, as a result of the efforts of Apps, Brock and Davey, press speculation that Ignatieff could be a star candidate for the Liberals in the next election, and possibly a candidate to eventually succeed Prime Minister Paul Martin, the leader of the governing Liberal Party of Canada.

After months of rumours and several denials, Ignatieff confirmed in November 2005 that he would run for a seat in the House of Commons in the winter 2006 election. It was announced that Ignatieff would seek the Liberal nomination in the Toronto riding of Etobicoke—Lakeshore.

Some Ukrainian-Canadian members of the riding association objected to the nomination, citing a perceived anti-Ukrainian sentiment in Blood and Belonging, where Ignatieff said: "I have reasons to take the Ukraine seriously indeed. But, to be honest, I'm having trouble. Ukrainian independence conjures up images of peasants in embroidered shirts, the nasal whine of ethnic instruments, phony Cossacks in cloaks and boots..." Critics also questioned his commitment to Canada, pointing out that Ignatieff had lived outside of Canada for more than 30 years and had referred to himself as an American many times. When asked about it by Peter Newman in a Maclean's interview published on April 6, 2006, Ignatieff said: "Sometimes you want to increase your influence over your audience by appropriating their voice, but it was a mistake. Every single one of the students from 85 countries who took my courses at Harvard knew one thing about me: I was that funny Canadian." Two other candidates filed for the nomination but were disqualified (one, because he was not a member of the party and the second because he had failed to resign from his position on the riding association executive). Ignatieff went on to defeat the Conservative candidate by a margin of roughly 5,000 votes to win the seat.

=== 2006 leadership bid ===
After the Liberal government was defeated in the January 2006 federal election, Paul Martin resigned the party leadership in March that same year. On April 7, 2006, Ignatieff announced his candidacy in the upcoming Liberal leadership race, joining several others who had already declared their candidacy.

Ignatieff received several high-profile endorsements of his candidacy. His campaign was headed by Senator David Smith, who had been a Chrétien organizer, Daniel Brock, Alfred Apps, Paul Lalonde, a Toronto lawyer and son of Marc Lalonde, along with Ian Davey, one of the organisers who had initially encouraged him to run for parliament. In addition a team of policy advisors was assembled, led by Toronto lawyer Brad Davis, and including Brock, fellow lawyers Mark Sakamoto, Sachin Aggarwal, Jason Rosychuck, Jon Penney, Nigel Marshman, Alex Mazer, Will Amos, and Alix Dostal, former Ignatieff student Jeff Anders, banker Clint Davis, economists Blair Stransky, Leslie Church and Ellis Westwood, and Liberal operatives Alexis Levine, Marc Gendron, Mike Pal, Julie Dzerowicz, Patrice Ryan, Taylor Owen and Jamie Macdonald.

Following the selection of delegates in the party's "Super Weekend" exercise on the last weekend of September, Ignatieff gained more support from delegates than other candidates, with 30% voting for him.

In August 2006, Ignatieff said he was "not losing any sleep" over dozens of civilian deaths caused by Israel's attack on Qana during its military actions in Lebanon. Ignatieff recanted those words the following week. Then, on October 11, 2006, Ignatieff described the Qana attack as a war crime (committed by Israel). Susan Kadis, who had been Ignatieff's campaign co-chair, withdrew her support following the comment. Other Liberal leadership candidates have also criticized Ignatieff's comments. Ariela Cotler, a Jewish community leader and the wife of prominent Liberal MP Irwin Cotler, left the party following Ignatieff's comments. Ignatieff later qualified his statement, saying "Whether war crimes were committed in the attack on Qana is for international bodies to determine. That doesn't change the fact that Qana was a terrible tragedy."

Ignatieff laid out his vision in Macleans for the countr,y which he described as a civic experiment, by advocating that Liberals need to be bold, draw inspiration from their history and renewed its traditions for the 21st century by advocating for nation-building agenda that have four basic priorities: strengthening a sustainable economy, strengthening the spine of our citizenship, strengthening our unity as a people, and strengthening our place in the world.

On October 14, Ignatieff announced that he would visit Israel to meet with Israeli and Palestinian leaders and "learn first-hand their view of the situation". He noted that Amnesty International, Human Rights Watch and Israel's own B'Tselem have stated that war crimes were committed in Qana, describing the suggestion as "a serious matter precisely because Israel has a record of compliance, concern and respect for the laws of war and human rights". Ignatieff added that he would not meet with Palestinian leaders who did not recognize Israel. However, the Jewish organization sponsoring the trip subsequently cancelled it, because of too much media attention.

==== Convention ====
At the leadership convention in Montreal, taking place at Palais des Congrès, Ignatieff entered as the apparent front-runner, having won more delegates to the convention than any other contender. However, polls consistently showed he had weak second-ballot support, and those delegates not already tied to him would be unlikely to support him later.

On December 1, 2006, Ignatieff led the leadership candidates on the first ballot, garnering 29% support. The subsequent ballots were cast the following day, and Ignatieff managed a small increase, to 31% on the second ballot, good enough to maintain his lead over Bob Rae, who had attracted 24% support, and Stéphane Dion, who garnered 20%. However, due to massive movement towards Dion by delegates who supported Gerard Kennedy, Ignatieff dropped to second on the third ballot. Shortly before voting for the third ballot was completed, with the realization that there was a Dion–Kennedy pact, Ignatieff campaign co-chair Denis Coderre made an appeal to Rae to join forces and prevent Dion from winning the Liberal Party leadership (on the basis that Stephane Dion's ardent federalism would alienate Quebecers), but Rae turned down the offer and opted to release his delegates.

With the help of the Kennedy delegates, Dion jumped up to 37% support on the third ballot, in contrast to Ignatieff's 34% and Rae's 29%. Rae was eliminated and the bulk of his delegates opted to vote for Dion rather than Ignatieff. In the fourth and final round of voting, Ignatieff took 2084 votes and lost the contest to Dion, who won with 2,521 votes.

Ignatieff confirmed that he would run as the Liberal MP for Etobicoke—Lakeshore in the next federal election.

=== Deputy Leader of the Liberal Party ===
On December 18, 2006, new Liberal leader Stéphane Dion named Ignatieff his deputy leader, in line with Dion's plan to give high-ranking positions to each of his former leadership rivals.

During three by-elections held on September 18, 2007, the Halifax Chronicle-Herald reported that unidentified Dion supporters were accusing Ignatieff's supporters of undermining by-election efforts, with the goal of showing that Dion could not hold on to the party's Quebec base. Susan Delacourt of the Toronto Star described this as a recurring issue in the party with the leadership runner-up. The National Post referred to the affair as, "Discreet signs of a mutiny." Although Ignatieff called Dion to deny the allegations, The Globe and Mail cited the NDP's widening lead after the article's release, suggested that the report had a negative impact on the Liberals' morale. The Liberals were defeated in their former stronghold of Outremont by future NDP leader Thomas Mulcair. Since then, Ignatieff urged the Liberals to put aside their differences, saying "united we win, divided we lose".

==== Interim Leader ====
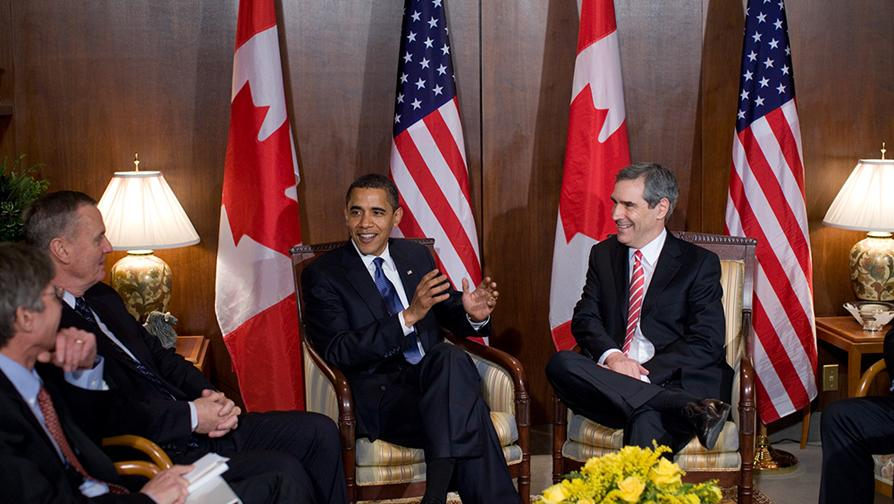
Ignatieff with US President Barack Obama in Ottawa on February 19, 2009

Dion announced that he would schedule his departure as Liberal leader for the next party convention, after the Liberals lost seats and support in the 2008 federal election. Ignatieff held a news conference on November 13, 2008, to once again announce his candidacy for the leadership of the Liberal Party of Canada.

When the Liberals reached an accord with the other opposition parties to form a coalition and defeat the government, Ignatieff reluctantly endorsed it. He was reportedly uncomfortable with a coalition with the NDP and support from the Bloc Québécois, and has been described as one of the last Liberals to sign on. After the announcement to prorogue Parliament, delaying the non-confidence motion until January 2009, Dion announced his intention to stay on as leader until the party selected a new one.

Leadership contender Dominic LeBlanc dropped out and threw his support behind Ignatieff. On December 9, the other remaining opponent for the Liberal Party leadership, Bob Rae, withdrew from the race, leaving Ignatieff as the presumptive winner. On December 10, he was formally declared the interim leader in a caucus meeting, and his position was ratified at the May 2009 convention.

On February 19, 2009, during U.S. President Barack Obama's post-election visit to Ottawa to meet Prime Minister Stephen Harper, which was the President's first foreign trip since taking office, Obama also met with Ignatieff as per parliamentary protocol where the leader of the opposition meets foreign dignitaries. Their discussion included climate change, Afghanistan and human rights.

=== Leader of the Liberal Party ===
On May 2, 2009, Ignatieff was officially endorsed as the leader of the Liberal Party by 97% of delegates at the party convention in Vancouver, British Columbia. The vote was mostly a formality as the other candidates had stepped down.

On August 31, 2009, Ignatieff announced that the Liberal Party would withdraw support for the government of Prime Minister Stephen Harper. However, the NDP under Jack Layton abstained and the Conservatives survived the confidence motion. Ignatieff's attempt to force a September 2009 election was reported as a miscalculation, as polls showed that most Canadians did not want another election. Ignatieff's popularity as well as that of the Liberals dropped off considerably immediately afterwards.

==== 2011 election ====
On March 25, 2011, Ignatieff introduced a motion of non-confidence against the Harper government to attempt to force a May 2011 federal election after the government was found to be in contempt of Parliament, the first such occurrence in Commonwealth history. The House of Commons passed the motion by 156–145.

The Liberals had considerable momentum when the writ was dropped. Ignatieff successfully squeezed NDP leader Jack Layton out of media attention by issuing challenges to Harper for one-on-one debates. In the first couple of weeks of the campaign, Ignatieff kept his party in second place in the polls, and his personal ratings exceeded that of Layton for the first time. However, opponents frequently criticized Ignatieff's perceived political opportunism, particularly during the leaders debates, during which Layton criticized Ignatieff for having a poor attendance record for Commons votes, commenting "You know, most Canadians, if they don't show up for work, they don't get a promotion". Ignatieff failed to defend himself against these charges, and the debates were said to be a turning point for his party's campaign. Ignatieff was also subject to scathing attack ads by the Conservative Party, slamming him as "Just visiting" Canada and "He Didn't Come Back For You" for the sake of political advancement. Near the end of the campaign, a late surge in support for Layton and the NDP relegated Ignatieff and the Liberals to third in the polls.

When Michael Ignatieff resigned as leader of Canada's Liberals at a press conference in Toronto on May 3rd, members of his team were seen at the back of the room in tears.... [It was] the sad end of a six-year experiment that they had once believed would conclude with a unique man, Ignatieff himself, pulling the sword of political governance out of the stone of political theory and coming to power in Canada as a contemporary philosopher-king.

— Jordan Michael Smith, World Affairs July/August 2011

On May 2, 2011, Ignatieff's Liberals lost 43 seats only winning 34 and thus slipped to third party status behind the NDP and the Conservatives, who gained a majority in Parliament. It was the worst result in the history of the Liberal Party, the worst result in Canadian history for an incumbent Official Opposition party, and the first time since Confederation the Liberals failed to finish first or second. Ignatieff was defeated by Conservative challenger Bernard Trottier, becoming the first incumbent Leader of the Official Opposition to lose his own seat since Charles Tupper's defeat in Cape Breton in 1900, as well as the first sitting Liberal leader since Mackenzie King lost his riding in the 1945 election. Reports suggested that Ignatieff had initially promised to move into a home inside his riding, but instead he resided in the downtown Toronto neighbourhood of Yorkville, which rankled Etobicoke–Lakeshore residents and reinforced perceptions of Ignatieff's political opportunism.

On May 3, 2011, Ignatieff announced that he would be resigning as leader of the party pending the appointment of an interim leader; his resignation went into effect on May 25 when Bob Rae was appointed as Ignatieff's interim replacement.

== Post-political career ==
In mid-2011, following his electoral defeat, Ignatieff became a senior resident with the University of Toronto's Massey College, where he taught courses in law and political science for the Munk School of Global Affairs, the School of Public Policy and Governance, and the Faculty of Law. In January 2013, Ignatieff rejoined the Harvard Kennedy School and divided his time between Toronto and Cambridge, Massachusetts. The next year, Ignatieff returned to Harvard full-time, and left the University of Toronto, to become Edward R. Murrow Chair of Press, Politics and Public Policy at the Harvard Kennedy School effective July 1, 2014. Ignatieff was appointed Cleveringa Professor of law, freedom and responsibility at Leiden University for the academic years 2013–2014.

In 2013, Ignatieff published a book about his political career called Fire and Ashes: Success and Failure in Politics. The British reviewer David Runciman commented in a book review, "for a clear-eyed, sharply observed, mordant but ultimately hopeful account of contemporary politics this memoir is hard to beat. After his defeat, a friend tries to comfort him by telling him that at least he'll get a book out of it. Ignatieff reacts with understandable fury. He didn't go into politics and through all that followed just to write a book. Still, it's some book."

=== President and Rector of Central European University ===
On May 5, 2016, it was announced that Michael Ignatieff would succeed John Shattuck to become the fifth president and rector of the Central European University (CEU) in Budapest, Hungary. On September 1, he was appointed the rector with the term ending on August 31, 2021.

Ignatieff oversaw a tumultuous period in the university's history, during which it accused the Hungarian government of challenging its legal right to continue to operate in Hungary. The position of Ignatieff and CEU was that the intervention from the Hungarian government was part of a wider vendetta on the part of prime minister Viktor Orbán against wealthy financier George Soros, the university's chief benefactor. Ignatieff's personal position was that the strain between the Hungarian government and CEU is part of a wider tension in Europe between democratic ideals and authoritarian tendencies within the European conservative right.

In 2019, Ignatieff was awarded the Dan David Prize for his contribution to defending democracy. During this time he continued to publish in scholarly journals. An example is The Responsibility to Protect in a Changing World Order: Twenty Years since Its Inception, an August 2021 article of his.

On 31 July 2021, Ignatieff stepped down as rector of CEU to be replaced by Shalini Randeria and announced he would step back into the classroom as a professor of history at CEU in January 2022.

== Views ==
=== International affairs ===
In October 2006, Ignatieff indicated that he personally would not support ballistic missile defence nor the weaponization of space. He referred to the likelihood of America developing a Missile Defense System in his book Virtual War, but did not voice support for Canadian participation in such a scheme.

On June 3, 2008, and on March 30, 2009, Ignatieff voted in support of non-binding motions in the House of Commons calling on the government to "allow conscientious objectors ... to a war not sanctioned by the United Nations ... [(including Iraq war resisters)] ... to ... remain in Canada ... ." However, on September 29, 2010, when those motions were proposed as a binding private member's bill from Liberal MP Gerard Kennedy, CTV News reported that Ignatieff "walked out during the vote." The bill then failed to pass this second reading vote by seven votes.

=== Extension of Canada's Afghanistan mission ===
During his time in Parliament, Ignatieff was one of the few opposition members supporting the minority Conservative government's commitment to Canadian military activity in Afghanistan. Prime Minister Stephen Harper called a vote in the House of Commons for May 17, 2006, on extending the Canadian Forces current deployment in Afghanistan until February 2009. During the debate, Ignatieff expressed his "unequivocal support for the troops in Afghanistan, for the mission, and also for the renewal of the mission." He argued that the Afghanistan mission tests the success of Canada's shift from "the peacekeeping paradigm to the peace-enforcement paradigm," the latter combining "military, reconstruction and humanitarian efforts together." The opposition Liberal caucus of 102 MPs was divided, with 24 MPs supporting the extension, 66 voting against, and 12 abstentions. Among Liberal leadership candidates, Ignatieff and Scott Brison voted for the extension. Ignatieff led the largest Liberal contingent of votes in favour, with at least five of his caucus supporters voting along with him to extend the mission. The vote was 149–145 for extending the military deployment. Following the vote, Harper shook Ignatieff's hand. In a subsequent campaign appearance, Ignatieff reiterated his view of the mission in Afghanistan. He stated: "the thing that Canadians have to understand about Afghanistan is that we are well past the era of Pearsonian peacekeeping."

=== Climate change policy ===
In the 2006 Liberal leadership race, Ignatieff advocated for measures to address climate change, including a carbon tax. During the 2008 federal election Dion's key policy plank was his Green Shift plan, a revenue neutral carbon tax which would put a price on greenhouse gas emissions while reducing income taxes. The Green Shift had been heavily criticized by the Conservatives and was believed to have been a significant factor in the party's poor showing in the election. Following the election Ignatieff announced he would not campaign on Dion's Green Shift. In a speech to the Edmonton Chamber of Commerce in February 2009, he said; "You can't win elections if you're adding to the input costs of a farmer putting diesel into his tractor, or you're adding to the input costs of a fisherman putting diesel into his fishing boat, or a trucker transporting goods". He went onto say that; "You've got to work with the grain of Canadians and not against them. I think we learned a lesson in the last election." In November 2009, he announced that a Liberal government would implement an industrial cap-and-trade system to combat climate change.

=== Forming of a potential coalition government ===
During the spring 2011 federal election, Ignatieff ruled out the formation of a coalition government with the NDP and Bloc parties. Contrary to the suggestion from the Conservative party that he was planning to form a government with the other opposition parties, Ignatieff issued a statement on March 26, 2011, stating that "[t]he party that wins the most seats on election day will form the government".

== Honorary degrees ==
Ignatieff had received several honorary doctorates, including:

Honorary degrees

Location	Date	School	Degree
Quebec	1995	Bishop's University	Doctor of Civil Law (DCL)
Scotland	28 June 1996	University of Stirling	Doctor of the University (D. Univ)
Ontario	25 October 2001	Queen's University	Doctor of Laws (LL.D)
Ontario	26 October 2001	University of Western Ontario	Doctor of Letters (D.Litt.)
New Brunswick	2001	University of New Brunswick	Doctor of Letters (D.Litt.)
Quebec	17 June 2002	McGill University	Doctor of Letters (D.Litt.)
Saskatchewan	28 May 2003	University of Regina	Doctor of Laws (LL.D)
Washington	2004	Whitman College	Doctor of Laws (LL.D)
New York	21 May 2006	Niagara University	Doctor of Humane Letters (DHL)
Netherlands	2007	Tilburg University	Doctorate
Scotland	2018	University of Edinburgh	Doctor of Science in Social Science
Netherlands	25 January 2019	Maastricht University	Doctorate
Great Britain	2024	University of Cambridge	Doctorate

== Electoral record ==
2011 Canadian federal election: Etobicoke—Lakeshore
Party	Candidate	Votes	%	±%	Expenditures
Conservative	Bernard Trottier	21,997	40.35	+5.48	$78,142.35
Liberal	Michael Ignatieff	19,128	35.08	-11.05	$68,176.10
New Democratic	Michael Erickson	11,046	20.26	+8.60	$19,716.93
Green	David Corail	2,159	3.96	-3.02	$6,090.24
Marxist–Leninist	Janice Murray	190	0.35	–	–
Total valid votes/expense limit		54,520	100.00	–	$91,715.45
Total rejected ballots		243	0.44	+0.02	
Turnout		54,763	64.02		
Eligible voters		85,547	–	–	

2008 Canadian federal election: Etobicoke—Lakeshore
Party	Candidate	Votes	%	±%	Expenditures
Liberal	Michael Ignatieff	23,536	46.13	▲2.5	$65,816
Conservative	Patrick Boyer	17,793	34.87	▼0.3	$86,667
New Democratic	Liam McHugh-Russell	5,950	11.66	▼3.9	$20,386
Green	David Corail	3,562	6.98	▲1.9	$946
Marxist–Leninist	Janice Murray	181	0.35	▲0.2	
Total valid votes/expense limit		51,022	100.00	$88,903	
Total rejected ballots		213	0.42		
Turnout		51,235			

2006 Canadian federal election: Etobicoke—Lakeshore
Party	Candidate	Votes	%	±%
Liberal	Michael Ignatieff	24,337	43.6	▼6.6
Conservative	John Capobianco	19,613	35.2	▲4.6
New Democratic	Liam McHugh-Russell	8,685	15.6	▲1.1
Green	Philip Ridge	2,853	5.1	▲0.7
Communist	Cathy Holliday	186	0.3	
Marxist–Leninist	Janice Murray	104	0.2	▼0.1
Total valid votes		55,778	100.0	

== Bibliography ==
=== Books ===
==== Novels ====
- Asya, 1991
- Scar Tissue, 1993
- Charlie Johnson in the Flames, 2005

==== Non-fiction ====
External videos
- Booknotes interview with Michael Ignatieff on Isaiah Berlin: A Life, January 24, 1999, C-SPAN
- Presentation by Ignatieff on Virtual War, May 9, 2000, C-SPAN
- Washington Journal interview with Ignatieff on The Lesser Evil, June 17, 2004, C-SPAN

- A Just Measure of Pain: Penitentiaries in the Industrial Revolution, 1780–1850, 1978
- (ed. with István Hont) Wealth and Virtue: The Shaping of Political Economy in the Scottish Enlightenment, 1983
- The Needs of Strangers, 1984
- The Russian Album, 1987
- Blood and Belonging: Journeys Into the New Nationalism, 1994
- Warrior's Honour: Ethnic War and the Modern Conscience, 1997
- Isaiah Berlin: A Life, 1998
- Virtual War: Kosovo and Beyond, 2000
- The Rights Revolution, 2000
- Human Rights as Politics and Idolatry, 2001
- Empire Lite: Nation-Building in Bosnia, Kosovo and Afghanistan, 2003
- The Lesser Evil: Political Ethics in an Age of Terror, 2004 (2003 Gifford Lectures)
- (ed.) American Exceptionalism and Human Rights, 2005
- True Patriot Love, 2009
- Fire and Ashes: Success and Failure in Politics, 2013
- The Ordinary Virtues: Moral Order in a Divided World, 2017
- On Consolation: Finding Solace in Dark Times, 2021

=== In committee ===
- Evans, Gareth; Sahnoun, Mohamed; Côté-Harper, Gisèle; Hamilton, Lee; Ignatieff, Michael; Lukin, Vladimir; Naumann, Klaus; Ramaphosa, Cyril; Ramos, Fidel V.; Sommaruga, Cornelio; Stein Barillas, Eduardo; Thakur, Ramesh. "The Responsibility to Protect: Report of the International Commission on Intervention and State Sovereignty". International Development Research Centre.

=== Essays and reporting ===
- "The Meaning of Diana", Prospect, October 23, 1997.
- "The Reluctant Imperialist", The New York Times Magazine, August 6, 2000.
- "What Did the C.I.A. Do to His Father?", The New York Times Magazine, April 1, 2001.
- "Intervention and State Failure", Dissent, Winter 2002.
- "Is the Human Rights Era Ending?", New York Times, February 5, 2002.
- "Barbarians at the Gates?", The New York Times Book Review, February 18, 2002.
- "Why Bush Must Send in His Troops", The Guardian, April 19, 2002.
- "No Exceptions?", Legal Affairs, May/June 2002.
- "The Rights Stuff", New York Times of Books, June 13, 2002.
- "Nation Building Lite" (cover story), The New York Times Magazine, July 28, 2002.
- "The Divided West", The Financial Times, August 31, 2002.
- "When a Bridge Is Not a Bridge", New York Times Magazine, October 27, 2002.
- "Mission Impossible?", A Review of A Bed for the Night: Humanitarianism in Crisis, by David Rieff (Simon and Schuster, 2002), The New York Review of Books, December 19, 2002.
- "American Empire: The Burden" (cover story), The New York Times Magazine, January 5, 2003.
- "I am Iraq", The New York Times Magazine, March 31, 2003 (Reprinted in The Guardian and The National Post).
- "Why Are We In Iraq?; (And Liberia? And Afghanistan?) (cover story), The New York Times Magazine, September 7, 2003.
- "Why America Must Know Its Limits", Financial Times, December 24, 2003.
- "Arms and the Inspector", Los Angeles Times, March 14, 2004.
- "The Year of Living Dangerously", (A follow-up to The Burden, discussing the war). The New York Times Magazine, March 14, 2004.
- "Could We Lose the War on Terror?: Lesser Evils" (cover story) The New York Times Magazine, May 2, 2004.
- "Mirage in the Desert", The New York Times Magazine, June 27, 2004.
- "The Terrorist as Auteur", The New York Times Magazine, November 14, 2004.
- "Democratic Providentialism", The New York Times Magazine, December 12, 2004.
- "The Uncommitted", The New York Times Magazine, January 30, 2005.
- "A Generous Helping of Liberal Brains", The Globe and Mail, March 4, 2005.
- "Who Are Americans to Think That Freedom Is Theirs to Spread?", The New York Times Magazine, June 26, 2005.
- "Iranian Lessons", The New York Times Magazine, July 17, 2005.
- "The Broken Contract", The New York Times Magazine, September 25, 2005.
- "What I Would Do If I Were The Prime Minister", Maclean's, September 4, 2006.
- "Getting Iraq Wrong", The New York Times Magazine, August 5, 2007.
- "Winter Wonder Brand", The New York Times Magazine, February 4, 2010.

=== Television reviews ===
Program title	Director	Reviewed in	Channel/Platform	Notes
Wormwood	Errol Morris	Ignatieff, Michael (February 22, 2018). "Who killed Frank Olson?". The New York Review of Books. 65 (3): 42–43.	Netflix	6 episodes

=== Screenplays ===
- Onegin, 1999 (with Peter Ettedgui)
- 1919, 1985 (with Hugh Brody)

=== Drama ===
- Dialogue in the Dark, 1989 (BBC)

== See also ==
- List of Canadian Leaders of the Opposition
- Official Opposition (Canada)
