= The Lesser Evil: Political Ethics in an Age of Terror =

2005 book by Michael Ignatieff

- Cover of the first edition
- Author: Michael Ignatieff
- Language: English
- Publication date: 2005
- Media type: Print (Hardcover and Paperback)
- Pages: 232
- Awards: Finalist for the 2004 Lionel Gelber Prize
- ISBN: 9780748622245

The Lesser Evil: Political Ethics in an Age of Terror is a lecture and book written by Michael Ignatieff as part of the Gifford Lectures. In it, Ignatieff considers the question of how, in a liberal democracy, it is possible to balance the legitimate rights of innocent citizens against the state's need to combat terrorism.

== Historical context ==
This book was written in 2003 to address questions of human rights and humanitarian policy which arose as a result of the issues surrounding the war on terror, particularly with regard to the US foreign policies of the time including the detention of terrorist suspects without trial at the Guantanamo Bay detention camp. At the time of writing, Ignatieff was the director of the Carr Center for Human Rights at Harvard's Kennedy School of Government.

== Publication history ==
The book is based on a series of six lectures that Ignatieff gave at the University of Edinburgh in 2003 as part of the Gifford Lectures. The book was initially published in hardcover form in 2004, then in 2005 in paperback by Edinburgh University Press. Then, later in 2005, a new paperback edition was published by the Princeton University Press including a new preface by the author.

== Structure and arguments ==
In this book Ignatieff argues that the war against terrorism requires acts which go beyond those permitted by our constitutional restraints and protections of the recognition of individual legal rights. To balance this necessary erosion of liberal freedoms and rights, Ignatieff presents a framework of judicial review, executive and Congressional oversight, free debate and limits on interrogation. He writes that "...defeating terror requires violence. It may also require coercion, secrecy, deception, even violation of rights...To defeat evil, we may have to traffic in evils: indefinite detention of suspects, coercive interrogations, targeted assassinations, even pre-emptive war."

== Reception ==
The Lesser Evil was reviewed in The New York Times and Times Higher Education in 2004, in Ethics & International Affairs in 2005, and in the Michigan Law Review in 2006. Ronald Steel wrote in The New York Times that "in concocting a formula for a little evil lite to combat the true evildoers, Michael Ignatieff has not provided, as his subtitle states, a code of 'political ethics in an age of terror' but rather an elegantly packaged manual of national self-justification."

Jedediah Purdy highlights what he sees as two of the principal sources of Ignatieff's approach - the jurisprudence of the Scottish Enlightenment thinkers such as Adam Smith and the work of Isaiah Berlin. These give Ignatieff's work a sense of the moral life as a product of the passions rather than a strict Platonic/Kantian idea of moral reasoning, and also from Berlin what can be described as "value pluralism" - in guiding our actions there is no clear unique moral right answer, we must trade off each freedom against the other, and particularly liberties and securities. Purdy describes The Lesser Evil as Ignatieff's attempt to respond to criticisms that his theory fails to provide a principled basis to guide our decisions on future actions. Purdy goes on to highlight what he sees as problems with Ignatieff's five tests for coercive measures, in that some of the individual tests are too indeterminate, and that he provides no detail as to how each of competing considerations expressed in the tests is to be weighed against each other.

== Sources ==
- De Wijze, Stephen A., Goodwin, Tom L., Bellamy on Dirty Hands and Lesser Evils: A Response, British Journal of Politics & International Relations; Aug2009, Vol. 11 Issue 3, p529-540, 12p ISSN 1369-1481
- Slater, JM The lesser evil: Political ethics in an age of terror POLITICAL SCIENCE QUARTERLY; WIN, 2004, 119 4, p684-p686, 3p ISSN 0032-3195
- Lewis, Anthony, Bush and the Lesser Evil. NEW YORK REVIEW OF BOOKS; May 27, 2004, 51 9
- Johnson, James Turner The lesser evil: political ethics in the age of terror First Things no 151 Mr 2005, p 44-47 ISSN 1047-5141
- Segev, R The lesser evil: political ethics in the age of terror ETHICS; JUL, 2005, 115 4, p821-p824, 4p. ISSN 0014-1704
- Brodeur, JP The lesser evil: political ethics in the age of terror THEORETICAL CRIMINOLOGY; MAY, 2005, 9 2, p227-p230, 4p ISSN 1362-4806
- Minow, M The lesser evil: Political ethics in an age of terror. HARVARD LAW REVIEW; MAY, 2005, 118 7, p2134-p2169, 36p. ISSN 0017-811X

== See also ==
- Lesser evil
