= LesserEvil =

American company producing snack foods

LesserEvil, LLC
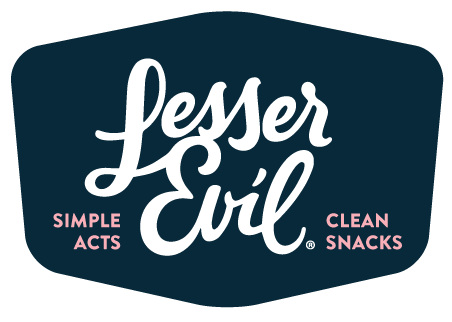
- Type: Private
- Industry: Food
- Founded: 2004; 22 years ago
- Founder: Michael A. Sands
- Headquarters: Danbury, Connecticut, U.S.
- Area served: North America
- Key people: Charles Coristine, CEO
- Products: Snack foods, organic foods
- Revenue: approaching $100M in 2023
- Owner: The Hershey Company
- Number of employees: 250
- Website: www.lesserevil.com

LesserEvil is an American snack company located in Danbury, Connecticut founded in 2004.

It makes a variety of packaged snack products including prepopped popcorn and extruded snacks. The firm promotes its products as a healthy alternative; in 2023 it was sued by a consumer for misrepresentation. It was acquired by The Hershey Company in 2025.

== History ==
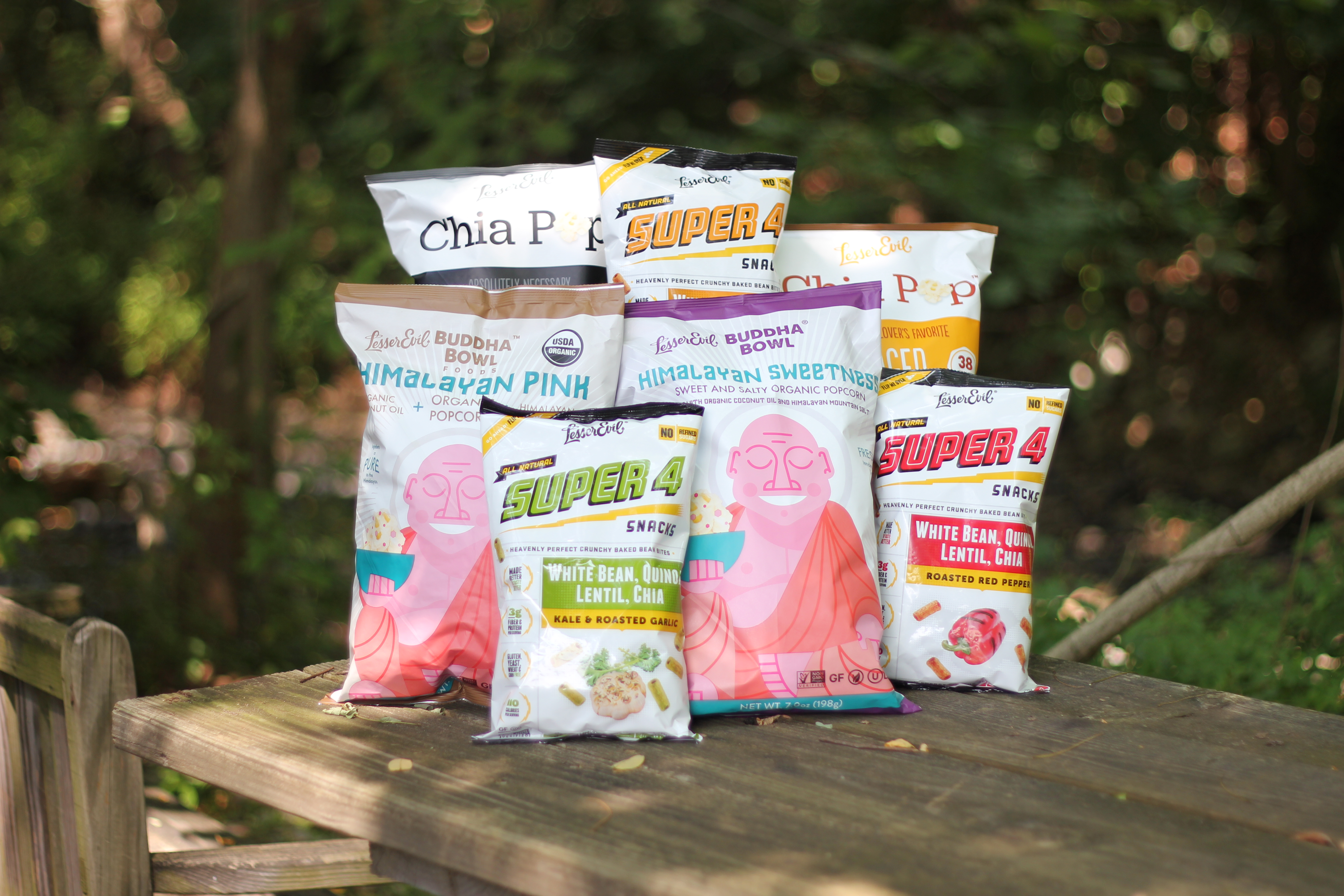
LesserEvil's packaging in 2014

LesserEvil was founded in 2004 by Michael A. Sands, Gene Hackman, and Jim Cramer in Tuckahoe, New York.

Their initial product offering was a kettlecorn and expanded into multiple varieties. In 2006, they introduced a second line, Krinkle Sticks, and later lines of extruded curls and puffs intended to compete in the cheese puff category.

In 2011, Charles Coristine, a former bond trader, acquired LesserEvil and opened its Danbury factory the following year. By 2013, the company's headquarters remained in Wilton, Connecticut, but operations moved to Commerce Park in Danbury. The factory is certified organic.

LesserEvil underwent a rebrand in 2019, which emphasized "mindful" snacking, reiterated by the guru mascots featured on the packaging.

In April 2022, the company acquired energy bar maker R.E.D.D. Bar. The following year, LesserEvil sold a “significant minority” stake of the business to Aria Growth Partners, with the intention to further develop manufacturing and retail distribution.

According to the Hartford Business Journal, the company was expected to have close to $100M in revenues in 2023 and was one of the largest producers of organic snacks in the US.

Bowl of LesserEvil cheddar flavored "Space Balls", 2026

In April 2025, Hershey signed an agreement to acquire LesserEvil. This transaction was completed in November.

== Ingredients ==
Carla Lalli Music, writing for Bon Appetit, dietician Wan Na Chun, speaking with Eat This, Not That, and dietician Mascha Davis speaking with Prevention noted the short list of ingredients for multiple popcorn products as a positive.

== Recognition ==
In 2022, Prevention named their Sun Popper Sour Cream and Onion product as their Best Protein Puff and Good Housekeeping named them their Best Vegan Puffs. In 2023, Self name the company's organic popcorn the best bagged popcorn. In 2024, the company's Homer’s Blend Organic Popcorn won the best popcorn award in Good Housekeeping’s Best Snack Awards.

== Controversies and litigation ==
=== False advertising lawsuit ===
In March 2023, LesserEvil was named as a defendant in a proposed class-action lawsuit filed in the U.S. District Court for the Eastern District of California. The plaintiff alleged that the company's packaging and marketing misrepresented certain products as healthy alternatives and made other nutrition-related claims, while the products allegedly contained relatively high levels of saturated fat. The lawsuit asserted claims under California consumer-protection and false-advertising laws.

In March 2025, a federal judge dismissed the claims challenging “healthier” as an implied nutrient-content claim, as well as a claim seeking injunctive relief, but allowed other false-advertising claims to proceed.

=== DOGE ===
In February 2025, LesserEvil received criticism after reports that Edward Coristine, a member of Elon Musk's Department of Government Efficiency (DOGE), was the son of LesserEvil CEO Charles Coristine. Following reports about the connection, online discourse called for a boycott of LesserEvil. The company subsequently released an email statement to consumers that noted it was not affiliated with political figures, policies, or groups and reaffirming its stated values of health, sustainability, and affordability.
