= Wealth of Elon Musk =

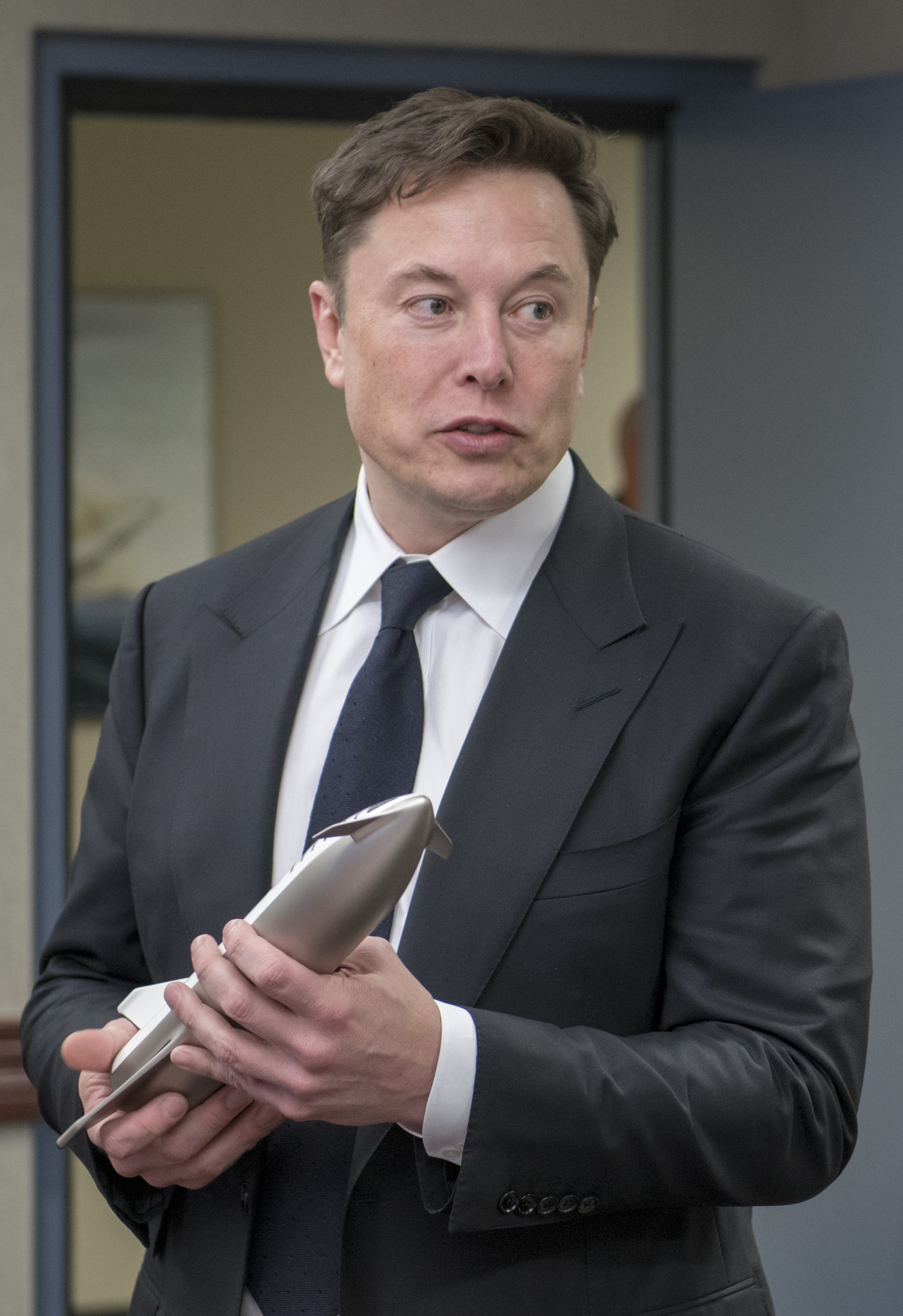
Musk in 2019 as SpaceX CEO; the company's IPO in 2026 led to him becoming the first US$ trillionaire.

Elon Musk is the wealthiest person in the world in terms of financial assets, with an estimated net worth of US$845 billion according to the Bloomberg Billionaires Index and $849.7 billion according to Forbes, as of November 8, 2026, primarily from his ownership stakes of 42% of SpaceX and 20% of Tesla. He is eligible to receive additional Tesla and SpaceX equity awards subject to certain conditions.

Musk was first listed on the Forbes list of The World's Billionaires in 2012, with a net worth of $2 billion. According to Forbes, his net worth reached $300 billion in 2021; $400bn in December 2024; $500bn in October 2025; $600bn and $700bn in December 2025; $800bn in February 2026; and he became the only trillionaire in terms of US dollars that month upon the initial public offering (IPO) of SpaceX. Since then, his net worth has been volatile, largely because of changes in SpaceX’s valuation. His net worth reached an intraday peak of $1.45 trillion in the week after the IPO, but by late July 2026, a SpaceX stock collapse had reduced this net worth by $750 billion, the largest net worth loss in history.

In May 2020, Musk pledged to sell almost all physical possessions and said he would "own no house", but in February 2026, The New York Times identified at least 37 companies that own properties which appear to be for Musk's personal use, including expensive condominiums, planes used by him for private travel and at least 1000 acres of land. His wealth is managed by Excession LLC, his family office, which has been run by Jared Birchall since 2016.

== History ==
Elon Musk made $180 million when PayPal was sold to eBay in October 2002.

Musk was first listed on the Forbes list of The World's Billionaires in 2012, with a net worth of $2 billion.

At the start of 2020, Musk had a net worth of $27bn. By the end of 2020, his net worth had increased by $150bn, mostly driven by his ownership of around 20% of Tesla.

Before Musk executed major sales of Tesla stock in 2021, Musk described himself as "cash poor".

Musk's net worth has been volatile. It dropped $16.3bn on September 8, 2020, the largest single-day plunge in Bloomberg Billionaires Index's history at the time.

In November 2020, Musk passed Facebook co-founder Mark Zuckerberg to become the third-richest person in the world; a week later he passed Microsoft co-founder Bill Gates to become the second-richest.

In November 2020, around 75% of Musk's wealth was derived from his ownership of Tesla stock, a proportion that fell to about 37% as of December 2022, (Note: According to The Wall Street Journal, he was worth $140 billion, with $52 billion of that attributable to his ownership of Tesla stock.) after selling nearly $40bn in company shares in late 2021 and 2022.

On January 7, 2021, Musk, with a net worth of $285bn, surpassed Amazon founder Jeff Bezos to become the richest person in the world. Bezos reclaimed the top spot on February 16, 2021. On September 27, 2021, after Tesla stock surged, Forbes announced that Musk had a net worth of over $190bn, and was the richest person in the world. In November 2021, Musk became the first person to have a net worth of more than $300bn.

On December 30, 2022, due to a decline in the value of Tesla shares, Musk's net worth declined by $200bn since its peak, making Musk the first person in history to have lost such an amount, which was recognized by Guinness World Records in January 2023.

Between December 2022 and June 2024, Musk, Bernard Arnault, and Jeff Bezos traded places among the 3 richest people in the world.

After the value of Tesla shares surged following the 2024 United States presidential election, in December 2024, Musk became the first person to have a net worth of more than $400bn.

However, Musk's association with the second presidency of Donald Trump then led to a decline in value in shares of Tesla, resulting in his net worth dropping by $126bn between December 2024 and March 2025.

For a few hours on September 10, 2025, Larry Ellison's net worth surpassed that of Musk.

Upon the initial public offering of SpaceX on June 12, 2026, Musk became the only person to have had a net worth exceeding $1 trillion. Since then, his net worth has fluctuated, reaching as high as $1.4 trillion in the week after the IPO, but has been under $1 trillion from July 2026 until October 2026 when it again went above $1 trillion.

=== Compensation from Tesla and failed legal challenge ===
Musk does not receive a salary from Tesla; he agreed with the board in 2018 to a compensation plan that ties his personal earnings to Tesla's valuation and revenue. The deal stipulated that Musk only received the compensation if Tesla reached certain revenue, market capitalization values, and earnings before interest, taxes, depreciation and amortization (EBITDA). It was the largest such deal ever done between a CEO and a company board. In the first award, given in May 2020, he was eligible to purchase 1.69 million Tesla shares (about 1% of the company, worth $800M at the time) at below-market prices.

In January 2024, Delaware judge Kathaleen McCormick ruled in a 2018 lawsuit that Musk's $55bn pay package from Tesla be rescinded. McCormick ruled that Tesla's board had failed to prove "that the compensation plan was fair." In response to the ruling, Musk posted on X: "Never incorporate your company in the state of Delaware." A re-ratification shareholders' vote passed in mid-June 2024, agreeing also to move Tesla's incorporation from Delaware to Texas; a lawsuit was filed by a Tesla investor beforehand that alleged Musk employed "coercive tactics" to move the vote in his favor. The Delaware Supreme Court overturned McCormick's decision in December 2025 because it was "inequitable" and that restoring the status quo ante was impossible after Musk had fully performed the terms of the agreement over six years. Musk's compensation package was restored and $1 in nominal damages was awarded. Musk exercised the stock options from his 2018 pay package on June 16, 2026.

== Giving ==
According to Walter Isaacson's biography on Musk, Musk has little interest in traditional philanthropy, calling most of it nonsense and estimating only about 20 cents of impact per dollar. Musk has been criticized for relatively minimal philanthropic giving; however, he believes that he can do more for humanity by investing his money in fields such as renewable energy, space exploration and AI safety as opposed to using his wealth for directly philanthropic purposes. Musk has said multiple times that it is much harder to give money away to do actual good versus it being very easy to give money away appearing to do good.

=== Musk Foundation ===
The Musk Foundation is a United States–based charitable foundation funded and directed primarily by Elon Musk. The foundation is dedicated to promoting renewable energy, crewed space exploration, pediatrics, science and engineering education, and the "development of safe artificial intelligence for the benefit of humanity".

At the end of 2024, the Musk Foundation had over $14 billion in assets. Since 2020, donations have largely been sent to organizations affiliated with Musk and his businesses.

The Musk Foundation has been criticized for both its selection of recipients of donations and a relatively low payout ratio. In 2021 and 2022, the Musk Foundation awarded less than 5% of its assets in donations, after its assets grew to several billion dollars. This means that it fell short of the legal minimum donation required to maintain its tax-exempt status.

The Guardian criticized the fact that the foundation financed various projects of Musk and his family members, although this is not unusual for billionaires and wealthy donors. The New York Times concluded that through 2022, about half of the Musk Foundation's grants went to organizations "tied" to Musk, one of his employees, or one of his companies.

=== Education ===
Musk has asserted that declining birth rates pose an existential threat to humanity and in 2021 donated $10M to the University of Texas at Austin to research the potential risks.

In December 2023, tax records revealed that Musk had donated $100M to a new foundation, "The Foundation", set up to create a primary and secondary school in Austin, Texas, focused on teaching science, technology, engineering, and mathematics (STEM) subjects. The foundation included plans to expand the project to the university level accredited by the Southern Association of Colleges and Schools.

In 2022, Musk allocated Tesla, Inc. stock valued at $2bn to his foundation.

=== Technology ===
In 2015, Musk donated $10M to Future of Life Institute, a nonprofit organization focused on challenges posed by advanced technologies, such as robotics.

=== Political contributions ===
In the fall of 2022, Musk contributed $50M to Citizens for Sanity, a political action committee (PAC) aligned with the policies of Donald Trump.

In 2023, Musk contributed $10M to the Ron DeSantis 2024 presidential campaign.

In 2024, Musk supported the Donald Trump 2024 presidential campaign, creating America PAC and donating $270M to it. He also gave $20.5M to pro-Trump RBG PAC. His donations in the 2024 election cycle totaled more than $291M, the most of any donor.

== Comparison to other wealthy individuals ==
Net worth and 1-year growth of the top 16 US billionaires individually and together, and all US billionaires as a whole, as of June 16, 2026

Musk's status as the first US dollar trillionaire drew historical comparisons, acclaim, and criticism. The New York Times drew the connection between Musk and John D. Rockefeller, who became the first US dollar billionaire in 1916. Rockefeller's wealth was estimated at $900 million in 1913, which was 2.3% of US gross national product (GNP); in early June 2026, before the IPO, The Wall Street Journal put Musk's fortune at roughly $970 billion. When Musk became a trillionaire, he was nearly four times as wealthy as the second richest person, Larry Page.

== Taxes paid ==
Musk paid $455 million in taxes on $1.52 billion of income between 2014 and 2018. According to ProPublica, a nonprofit investigative journalism organization, Musk paid no federal income taxes in 2018. According to Musk, his 2021 tax bill was $11bn following the sale of $14bn worth of Tesla stock, close to a $12bn CNBC estimate.

== See also ==
- Dogecoin#Elon Musk and Dogecoin
- Department of Government Efficiency
