= Gene Hamilton =

Gene Hamilton may refer to:

- Gene Hamilton (cyclist), American mountain bike racer and coach
- Gene Hamilton (lawyer), American lawyer and Trump administration official
- Eugene Hamilton (physician), American medical researcher
- Eugene Hamilton (American politician), American politician from Mississippi
- Eugene Hamilton or Bling-Bling Boy, fictional character from Johnny Test

== See also ==
- Eugene Hamilton (disambiguation page)
