= Eugene Hamilton =

Eugene Hamilton may refer to:

- Eugene Hamilton (physician) (1910–2005), American OB/GYN and medical researcher
- Eugene Hamilton (American politician), American politician from Mississippi
- Eugene Hamilton (Kittitian politician), former Deputy Prime Minister of Saint Kitts and Nevis

== See also ==
- Gene Hamilton (disambiguation)
