= Musk Foundation =

US-based charitable foundation

- Formation: 24 December 2001
- Founders: Elon Musk; Kimbal Musk
- Type: Non-operating private foundation
- Tax ID no.: EIN 85-2133087
- Legal status: 501(c)(3) organization
- Headquarters: Austin, Texas, U.S.
- President: Elon Musk
- Revenue: $95 million (2024)
- Disbursements: $474 million (2024)
- Endowment: $14.7 billion (2024)
- Staff: 0
- Website: www.muskfoundation.org

The Musk Foundation is a United States–based charitable foundation funded and directed primarily by Elon Musk. The foundation is dedicated to promoting renewable energy, crewed space exploration, pediatrics, science and engineering education, and the "development of safe artificial intelligence for the benefit of humanity".

At the end of 2024, the Musk Foundation had over $14 billion in assets. Since 2020, donations have largely been sent to organizations affiliated with Musk and his businesses.

== Formation and organization ==
The Musk Foundation was established by Elon Musk and his brother Kimbal Musk in December 2001. It was initially registered in Los Angeles. It is now based in Austin, the capital of Texas, and files under EIN 85-2133087, for which tax exemption was issued in September 2020. The foundation has no employees or full-time staff. It is managed by an unpaid board of directors consisting of Elon Musk and employees of his family office, Jared Birchall and Matilda Simon.

== Assets and inflows ==
The foundation was initially endowed with about $2.1 million in eBay shares. Between 2007 and 2014, Musk added a little over $3.1 million in cash. In 2016, Elon Musk donated Tesla shares worth $254 million to the foundation. In 2020, the foundation received another $4 million.

In 2021, Musk donated more Tesla shares to the Musk Foundation, worth $5.7 billion at the time. Tax experts said the gift could have saved him more than $2 billion in taxes. Musk also donated Tesla shares worth about $1.95 billion in 2022; the Musk Foundation's 2022 tax filing reported $2.25 billion in contributions received.

== Donations ==
Analysis of tax filings by Bloomberg News and The New York Times have found that the Musk Foundation donations largely go to other projects affiliated with Musk or with benefits to his businesses. In 2021, 2022, and 2023, the Musk Foundation failed to give away the minimum level of its assets, 5%, required by the Internal Revenue Service to avoid paying tax penalties.

From 2002 to 2018, the foundation gave $25 million directly to nonprofit organizations, $10 million of which went to OpenAI, which Musk co-founded, which was a nonprofit at the time. Including about $75 million routed through donor-advised funds, Musk had given about $100 million through his foundation by 2018. Other recipients included the University of Pennsylvania, the Wikimedia Foundation, which operates Wikipedia, the AI think tank Future of Life Institute, the X-Prize Foundation for the Global Learning X-Prize, and the Sierra Club. Other beneficiaries included his brother Kimbal's nonprofit Big Green. A $10,000 donation to the Multidisciplinary Association for Psychedelic Studies helped fund an art project at the Burning Man festival in Nevada in 2013.

In 2020, the foundation donated $60,000 to the Ad Astra School, which Musk co-founded in 2014 on SpaceX's campus in Hawthorne, California; five of its 14 students in its first year were his children. The California school closed in 2020, after which faculty launched the independent online-only Astra Nova School; a new Ad Astra school opened in Bastrop, Texas, near a SpaceX base, in 2024. The foundation also donated to the Los Angeles private schools Crossroads School and Windward School in 2020.

In September 2021, the Musk Foundation donated $55 million to St. Jude Children's Research Hospital as part of a fundraiser by SpaceX customer Jared Isaacman. In the same year, it pledged $100 million for an XPRIZE contest for technologies to remove carbon dioxide from the atmosphere.

In both 2021 and 2022, the Musk Foundation gave away about $160 million. Musk's foundation gave about $100 million to seed "The Foundation", a new Texas charity run by Birchall that plans to open a STEM-focused school and eventually a university in the Austin area.

In 2024, the Musk Foundation gave away $474 million, more than in any prior year, while holding over $14 billion in assets. $370 million went to The Foundation, which runs the private Ad Astra school near Musk company offices in Bastrop County, Texas.

The foundation's grants from 2025 onward had not been publicly filed as of October 2026. In early 2026, the Memphis-Shelby County Schools board considered an in-kind donation from the foundation, estimated at about $6 million, for repairs at three elementary schools and student-support programs, in an area where Musk's xAI operates data centers. In December 2025 the foundation gave $1.85 million to the police department of Southaven, Mississippi, for equipment including Flock cameras and a drone system, as xAI pursued a data center there.

== Reception ==
Both the selection of recipients of donations and a relatively low payout ratio have been criticized. In 2021 and 2022, the Musk Foundation awarded less than 5% of its assets in donations, after its assets grew to several billion dollars, falling short of the legal minimum payout for private foundations and exposing it to a potential penalty tax. The Guardian criticized the fact that the foundation financed various projects of Musk and his family members, although this is not unusual for billionaires and wealthy donors. The New York Times concluded that in 2021 and 2022, about half of the Musk Foundation's grants went to organizations "tied" to Musk, one of his employees, or one of his companies. Musk's philanthropy would be "largely self-serving."

According to the biographer Walter Isaacson, Musk has little interest in conventional philanthropy. He believes that he can do more for humanity by leaving his money in his companies and pursuing the goals of sustainable energy, space exploration and AI safety with them. On December 12, 2024, The New York Times reported the foundation again awarded less than 5% of its assets in donations in 2024.

== See also ==
- List of wealthiest charitable foundations
- RBG PAC
- America PAC
