= VoteSafe =

VoteSafe may refer to:

- VoteSafe, a bipartisan group chaired by Republican politician Tom Ridge
- VoteSafe.org, funded by America PAC under leadership of Elon Musk
