= Trump–Musk feud =

2025 American political dispute

- Part of the second presidency of Donald Trump
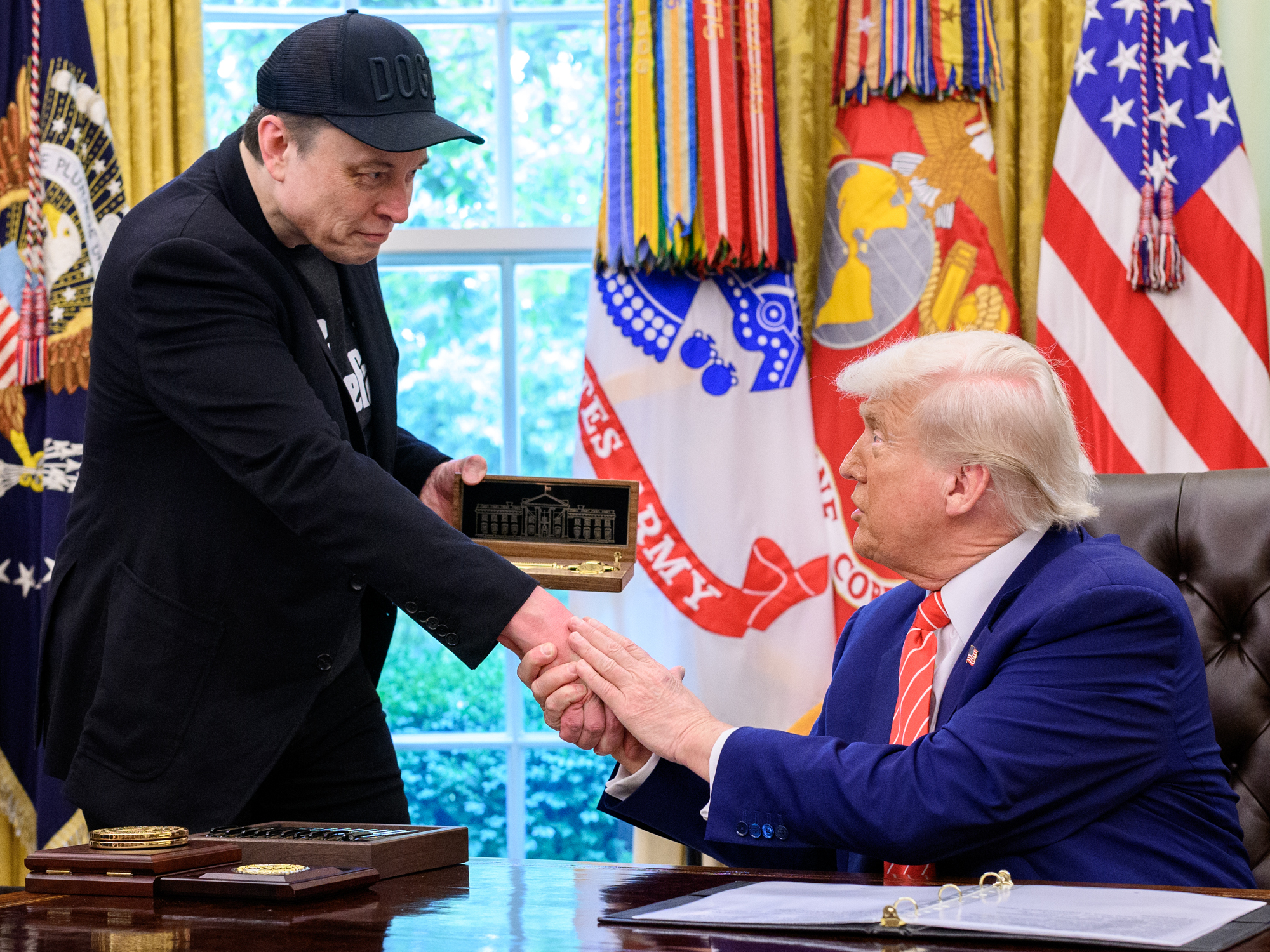
- Elon Musk and Donald Trump during Musk's sendoff in the Oval Office, May 30, 2025
- Date: First phase: June 5–7, 2025 (2 days); Second phase: June 28 – September 21, 2025 (2 months, 3 weeks and 3 days)
- Caused by: Musk's criticisms of the One Big Beautiful Bill Act
- Medium: Social media (X and Truth Social)
- Status: Reunited

Parties
Donald Trump	Elon Musk
- Musk says he is responsible for Trump winning the 2024 presidential election but that Trump showed "such ingratitude"; Musk claims that Trump is in the Epstein files; Musk apologizes, later praises Trump; Trump and Musk not on speaking terms; Musk resumes attacks on the One Big Beautiful Bill Act; Musk announces the America Party; Musk and Trump reunite at the memorial service of Charlie Kirk

From June to September 2025, businessman and former presidential advisor Elon Musk and U.S. president Donald Trump engaged in a series of social media attacks, primarily across X (formerly Twitter) and Truth Social (platforms owned by Musk and Trump, respectively), following Musk's departure from the second Trump administration with his criticisms of the One Big Beautiful Bill Act, a bill intended to be landmark legislation for Trump.

Prior to being political allies in 2024, Musk and Trump shared a history of mutual provocation. While the relations between the two had warmed, in July 2025 however, Trump escalated the feud, stating at a rally in Michigan, "Maybe it's time he went back to where he came from". After their public feud began to thaw, with Musk sharing Trump posts on his X account and Trump calling him a good person, the two men publicly reunited at Charlie Kirk's memorial service in September 2025.

== Background ==
Musk criticized Donald Trump prior to his first presidency in 2016 and the two feuded in 2022, as well as subsequent years. In 2024 there flourished what was described by The Independent as a "rapid and intense bromance between two of the world's most powerful men." In February 2025, Musk publicly stated he loved Trump as "a straight man", before feuding again with President Trump in June.

=== 2022 feud ===
In July 2022, Trump referred to Musk as a "bullshit artist" and called Musk's contract with Twitter "rotten". Musk responded by describing Trump as being too old for the presidency, instead favoring Ron DeSantis for the 2024 presidential election. Afterwards, Trump stated on Truth Social that Musk had come to the White House requesting help with subsidized projects and that had he been asked to beg, "he would have done it"; Trump also said on Truth Social that "Now Elon should focus on getting himself out of the Twitter mess because he could owe $44 billion for something that's perhaps worthless. Also, lots of competition for electric cars!".

In 2022, after Trump's Twitter suspension was reversed, Musk told Isaacson about Trump that "he's disruptive. He's the world's champion of bullshit." In 2024, New York Magazine described the feud over the past few years as "on-again, off-again".

=== 2024 presidential election ===
Cash crunched by more than $50 million in legal fees, the Trump campaign met with Musk and other donors in March 2024; Musk said that he was "leaning away" from Biden. Trump declared having helped Musk in the past. Musk created the America Super PAC on May 22. Musk publicly endorsed Trump after the July 13 Butler assassination attempt. Musk hosted an X live stream on August 12 with Trump, in which he floated the idea of a "government efficiency commission". Musk ended up contributing over US$290 million to Trump's presidential campaign.

=== Second Trump administration ===
In the second Trump administration, Musk led the Department of Government Efficiency (DOGE) in an effort to slash regulations, cut expenditures, and restructure federal agencies. Musk served as a special government employee, limiting his tenure to 130 days.

Musk played a prominent role in campaigning during the 2025 Wisconsin Supreme Court election, spending at least US$23 million through political action committees. His role in the election was a political liability for Brad Schimel. CBS News observed that Trump stopped posting about Musk by April, when he posted about six times a week before.

However, the DOGE initiative was met with widespread opposition, both from government and the public. In response to the backlash, Musk told investors in the April 22, 2025 Tesla earnings call that he would spend less time on DOGE going forward. During an interview at the 2025 Qatar Economic Forum on May 20, Musk told that he would scale back political spending.

=== Isaacman nomination ===
Trump celebrated Musk in an Oval Office farewell ceremony on May 30. The New York Times reported that, immediately after reporters left, Trump confronted Musk over political donations made to Democrats by Jared Isaacman, a Musk ally who was Trump's nominee administrator of NASA. Trump informed Isaacman hours later that his nomination was being withdrawn.

Isaacman told in an All-in episode that he believed Trump's retraction was more related to Musk's departure than his past donations, described himself as right-leaning, and supported Trump's agenda. Multiple sources reported that Sergio Gor, White House personnel director, was behind the retraction. On November 4, Trump renominated Issacman as NASA administrator.

=== Musk on the Big Beautiful Bill ===
In a CBS interview on May 27, Musk criticized the "Big Beautiful Bill" passed by Congress on May 22. Musk argued that it increased the deficit and undermined DOGE's work. During an Oval Office sendoff on May 30, Trump said that Musk was "not really leaving" the White House.

== Timeline ==
=== June 3 ===
On June 3, 2025, at 3:32 p.m EST, Musk warned bill supporters: "In November next year, we fire all politicians who betrayed the American people". Three hours later, he called the "pork-filled" bill a "disgusting abomination". In the next two days, Musk continued, asking for a bill that does not increase the debt ceiling, saying that bankrupting America was not acceptable, and asking to "KILL the BILL". Republicans' endorsement of the bill did not change.

=== June 5 ===
Trump comments on Elon Musk during his meeting with German Chancellor Friedrich Merz in the Oval Office; June 2025.

Shortly before noon, Trump sat with German chancellor Friedrich Merz in the Oval Office and answered journalists' questions for more than 40 minutes on live TV. When asked about Musk's criticism of the bill, Trump said that he was "disappointed" because he "always liked Elon", that Musk was critical because of the cuts to electric vehicle subsidies, and that he would have won Pennsylvania without him. While the interview went on, Musk fired back that Trump could keep his subsidies as long as the bill was "slim and beautiful". Trump also said Musk knew the bill "better than anybody" and that his Washington nostalgia may have turned to derangement; Musk responded that he was never shown the bill, that Trump would have lost the election if not for him, and ended with "such ingratitude".

Later Musk re-shared 2012–13 posts he found hours earlier in which Trump and various Republicans were chastising Congress on deficits.

==== America Party ====
Avatar of Elon Musk

Elon Musk
(@elonmusk)
tweeted:

Is it time to create a new political party in America that actually represents the 80% in the middle?

Yes	80.4%
No	19.6%
5,630,775 votes · Final results

June 5, 2025

In a tweet posted at 1:57pm ET, Musk floated the creation of a political party to represent the "eighty percent in the middle". Half an hour later, Musk replied to Laura Loomer that "Trump has 3.5 years left as President", but that he will be around for more than 40 years. With more than 80% of "yes" votes to his poll.

==== Flurry of threats ====
Avatar of Elon Musk

Elon Musk
(@elonmusk)
tweeted:

Time to drop the really big bomb:

@realDonaldTrump is in the Epstein files. That is the real reason they have not been made public.

Have a nice day, DJT!

June 5, 2025

After the press conference, Trump turned to Truth Social to address the situation. He repeated that Musk went "CRAZY" about the "EV Mandate", which Musk immediately called a lie. Trump then threatened to cut Musk's government contracts. In response, Musk said that Trump was in the Epstein files, and shared a 1992 video of Trump partying with Jeffrey Epstein.

Musk then stated that SpaceX was decommissioning its Dragon 2 spacecraft. Crew Dragon is the only operational American crewed vehicle capable of docking with the International Space Station, while Cargo Dragon and Cygnus operate American cargo missions to the station. Musk deleted the post shortly after it attracted attention, and later declared that the spacecraft would not be decommissioned while responding to an X user who advised him to "cool off". Two minutes later, Musk called for a third Trump impeachment.

==== Tariffs and truce ====
Musk reiterated that tariffs would cause a recession in the second half of 2025.

Later that evening, Musk responded to hedge fund billionaire Bill Ackman's plea that the country was stronger when Musk and Trump were allies, saying he was not wrong. Politico reported that Musk and Trump were scheduled to be on a call to reconcile.

==== Cutting ties ====
Musk unfollowed the Twitter accounts of Stephen Miller, Trump's deputy chief of staff for policy and his homeland security advisor; he also unfollowed Charlie Kirk, a right-wing influencer; the two men appeared on Kirk's show to praise the One Big Beautiful Bill Act.

=== June 6 ===
Late in the night of June 5, Musk approved of a tweet stating that the two main parties have no political will to reduce the national debt. Early on June 6, Trump told ABC News that Musk had "lost his mind" and that he was not interested in speaking to Musk, and repeated in a CNN interview that he won't be speaking to him in the near future. The White House later stated that no call between Trump and Musk was planned. A White House official later said that Trump was considering selling the red Tesla Model S he received from Musk.

According to Bloomberg News, Trump aides signaled that Trump was moving on and that he would not cancel Musk's government contracts. The Washington Post reported that Trump tried to explain Musk's behavior by saying he was a "big-time drug addict".

Dmitry Novikov told TASS that Russia could offer Musk political asylum, but that he would not need any.

Musk reached out to the White House Chief of Staff, Susie Wiles and Vice President JD Vance to announce a halt to his criticism of the President and to explore a possible mending of the relationship with the President.

=== June 7 ===
In a morning interview with NBC News on June 7, Trump stated that he did not wish to reconcile with Musk, and added that Musk would face 'very serious consequences' if he funded Democrats. Trump also mentioned having saved Musk's life during his first administration.

In an interview with Theo Von aired on June 7 but recorded on June 5, JD Vance said that he will always stand by Trump's side, that Musk made a huge mistake, and that he wished Musk returned "into the fold". Vance also conceded that the bill "wasn't perfect".

By the morning, several tweets were deleted from Musk's account: the Epstein accusation, the call to impeachment, and the claim that Trump would not have won without his help. Later on the same day, Musk reiterated one of his earlier threats that if this "insane spending bill passes, the America Party will be formed the next day".

=== Détente ===
On June 9, during ongoing protests in Los Angeles, Musk deleted his posts calling for Trump's impeachment and praised the Trump administration's actions towards the protesters. During a press conference the same day, Trump also shifted his stance on Musk saying, "We had a good relationship, I wish him well, very well". Late in the evening, the President took a call from Musk, which led the following day to a public admission of regret. The next day, it was further reported that Musk had a call with Trump, where he expressed remorse for attacking Trump.

On June 11, Musk publicly stated via Twitter that he regretted some of his posts about Trump because "they went too far", and Trump showed appreciation for the apology. A week later, Musk lashed out at Sergio Gor, an ally of the Trump family who led the Right for America super PAC, calling his identity into question, and calling him a "snake". Musk later clarified that he was accusing Gor of having committed "a serious crime". Senate Republicans hold Gor responsible for undermining the nomination of Isaacman at NASA.

On June 27 Musk donated ten million dollars to super PACs associated with House and Senate Republicans and five million dollars to Trump's super PAC MAGA Inc.

=== Reprisal ===
Musk renewed his attack on Trump's Big Beautiful Bill in late June. On June 28, Musk wrote on Twitter "The latest Senate draft bill will destroy millions of jobs in America and cause immense strategic harm to our country," and that it would be "political suicide for the Republican Party". On June 30, Trump threatened to use DOGE, an initiative that Musk once headed, to look into Musk's business contracts with the government. On July 1, Musk said he will donate to the reelection campaign of Rep. Thomas Massie, who was opposed to Trump's bill. The same day, Trump stated he would "take a look" at the possibility of deporting Musk.

In July, Trump reacted to Musk and the proposed America Party by describing Musk as "off the rails" on Truth Social, while Musk criticized the Trump administration response on the Jeffrey Epstein case.

=== August 6 ===
During a press conference on August 6, a reporter asked Trump about the accuracy of a recent Gallup poll which stated that Musk was the "most unpopular figure" in the United States and if he missed Musk. Trump responded that he was unsure of the poll's accuracy, acknowledged that Musk "had a bad moment", but also said that Musk was "a good person."

=== Public reunion ===
During Charlie Kirk's memorial service in Glendale, Arizona, Trump and Musk were observed engaging in conversation and handshakes with each other. Musk posted a picture of his interaction with Trump on X with the caption "For Charlie", implying that their tensions have been resolved. The White House shared social media posts of their reunion.

A few days later, Musk's xAI reached an agreement with the General Services Administration to provide federal agencies with Grok at a bargain price for two years.

In November 2025, The New York Times reported that Musk backtracked from the project of a third-party, and that sources close to him noticed that Musk was unaware of the many difficulties in setting up a new party.

== Effects ==
Musk and Trump in October 2026

On June 5, Musk's net worth dropped an estimated US$34 billion. This is the second biggest single-day wealth decline in modern history, after Musk's previous 2021 loss. Shares in Tesla, Inc. fell fifteen percent, its worst day since the COVID-19 pandemic. Trading volumes for Tesla put options exceeded four million contracts, the highest on record. TSLA short sellers ended their day raking US$4 billion. Trump Media & Technology Group shares fell eight percent.

The feud has risked US$100 million in political donations to Trump-affiliated organizations that Musk was set to give. The dispute also threatened a US$5 billion debt sale for Musk's xAI.

Immediately after the early June spat, Musk recorded his lowest net favorability in YouGov records, Musk's net favorability among Republicans dropping by 20 points. Around nearly 40% of respondents to an early July poll by Quantus Insights indicated they would support Musk's third party.

James Fishback, a Trump supporter who floated the idea of a "DOGE dividend", launched in July the Full Support for Donald PAC, a super PAC "designed to blunt Elon Musk's political ambitions". A DOGE employee has tried to contact Fishback through a Veterans Affairs' account; the White House said that person no longer works there.

According to Wall Street Journal sources, DOGE staffers who stayed within the administration were tested for loyalty.

The "Elon Musk Smart Manufacturing Zone" on the Gaza-Israel border, where US EV companies would build cars for export to Europe, was planned prior to their relationship souring, now leaving Musk's involvement in doubt.

FOX News reported in August 2025 that Musk had halted plans to create his America Party.

The Wall Street Journal reported in August 2026 that Trump privately says his relationship with Musk was permanently changed by the feud.

== Reactions and comparisons ==
=== Within the United States ===
The feud left Silicon Valley divided. Musk's allies feared that other Silicon Valley figures who followed Musk into government could lose their positions, including David Sacks, Sriram Krishnan, and Michael Grimes.

The dissolution of Musk and Trump's relationship was praised by some Make America Great Again followers. A YouGov survey indicated that most Republicans support Trump in the feud, while most Democrats were neutral. When asked to react to a statement from Musk on the GOP-backed spending bill, 56% said they agreed and 17% said they disagreed.

Steve Bannon encouraged Trump to cancel Musk's federal contracts and investigate his immigration status. This has led to the possibility of Musk being deported from the United States. After Bannon called for Trump to seize SpaceX with an executive order, Musk referred to him as a "communist retard".

House minority leader Hakeem Jeffries referred to the feud as a "GOP civil war". The Democratic Party's Twitter account called to "KILL THE BILL AND RELEASE THE EPSTEIN FILES!" Democratic representatives Stephen Lynch and Robert Garcia sent a letter to attorney general Pam Bondi and Federal Bureau of Investigation director Kash Patel inquiring about Musk's allegation that Trump was present in government files on Epstein.

Representative Ro Khanna argued that Democrats should court Musk.

On social media, comparisons between the feud and that in Mean Girls (2004), as well as the Drake–Kendrick Lamar feud, were made. Senate minority leader Chuck Schumer referenced "Bad Blood", a song by Taylor Swift believed to be about her feud with Katy Perry.

=== Outside the United States ===
Trump's focus on Musk during his meeting with Friedrich Merz was met with relief from several German commentators, who noted caustic meetings with Ukrainian president Volodymyr Zelensky and South African president Cyril Ramaphosa.

In Russia, the government described the feud as an internal issue for the United States. However, the feud was widely discussed among Russian political and business leaders. Dmitry Rogozin, a Russian ultranationalist politician, encouraged Musk to emigrate to Russia.

Dmitry Medvedev, the deputy chairman of the Security Council, joked that he was willing to broker a truce between Musk and Trump.

== See also ==
- UniTeam – a political alliance in the Philippines that turned into a feud between the Marcos and Duterte political families
  - Sara Duterte – Philippine vice president who issued an assassination threat against her former UniTeam ally President Bongbong Marcos and faces an impeachment
