= Jared Birchall =

American business executive (born 1974)

- Born: Jared John Birchall; September 1974 (age 52); Modesto, California, US
- Education: Brigham Young University (BA)
- Title: CEO of Neuralink; Managing Director of Excession LLC
- Board member of: The Boring Company; Musk Foundation
- Children: 5

Jared John Birchall (born September 1974) is an American business executive and a former banker. He has been the manager of Elon Musk's family office since 2016. Birchall holds executive or administrative roles in some of Musk’s other ventures, including Neuralink, where he is CEO although not involved in daily operations; The Boring Company; Musk Foundation; and xAI.

== Early life and education ==
Birchall was born in September 1974 in Modesto, California. As one of 11 children, his family toured California as part of a musical group called "The Birchall Family Singers". He earned an Eagle Scout rank in his youth. He entered the Brigham Young University in Provo, Utah, in 1992 and graduated in 1999 with a Bachelor of Arts degree. Before graduating, he also spent two years as a Mormon missionary.

== Career ==
=== 1999–2016: Financial career ===
Birchall started his career in finance at Goldman Sachs in New York City as a financial analyst in 1999. The next year, he moved to Los Angeles to work at Merrill as a private wealth adviser. According to Financial Industry Regulatory Authority records, he was terminated in 2010 for "sending correspondence to a client without management approval". Between 2010 and 2016, he was a senior vice president of private banking at Morgan Stanley.

=== 2016–present: Working for Elon Musk ===
Birchall got acquainted with business magnate Elon Musk during his tenure at Morgan Stanley when as a client adviser he was involved in arranging a nine-figure amount in bank loans at a time when Musk was low on funds. Musk hired him out of Morgan Stanley in 2016 to set up and manage his family office—Excession LLC.

When Neuralink was founded by Musk in 2016, corporate filings listed Birchall as its chief executive, chief financial officer, and president. He is not involved in daily operations of the company and that his name was listed on the filings for legal convenience. In 2018, Birchall was named as a director and executive of The Boring Company, a tunnel construction services company also founded by Musk. He is also a member of the board of the Musk Foundation and Ad Astra—a Texas-based online experimental school founded by Musk for the children of SpaceX employees, including Musk's kids.

Dubbed as Musk's personal fixer and right-hand man, Birchall has also been tasked with managing itinerary, hiring bodyguards, and selling homes for Musk. In 2018, he was CEO of Foundation Security—a detective and armored car services company. During that year, in the lead up to a defamation case against Musk by a British caver following the Tham Luang cave rescue, Birchall paid over $50,000 of Musk's funds to hire a private investigator, who turned out to be a convicted fraudster, to dig up dirt on the caver. Birchall stated in court deposition he had an "instinct to protect Musk".

In 2021, Birchall opposed the idea of having Igor Kurganov—a professional poker player without a financial background and an advocate for effective altruism who had quickly become close to Musk during the COVID-19 pandemic and entrusted with co-managing the foundation—handle charity requests. Musk terminated Kurganov the following year after Birchall reported that Kurganov had drawn the attention of the Federal Bureau of Investigation over foreign interference concerns.

He joined the board of the Dogecoin Foundation—a nonprofit that advocates the Dogecoin ecosystem—as legal and financial adviser in August 2021. In a July 2023 court filing, Birchall declared that he exclusively manages Musk's cryptocurrency trades.

He played a critical role in the acquisition of Twitter by Elon Musk in 2022. He was heavily involved in the buyout negotiations and was in charge of dealing with the big banks to arrange multi-billion dollar loans that were key to closing the deal before a court-imposed deadline, which otherwise would have forced a trial. As Twitter underwent massive cost-cutting under Musk, Birchall was responsible for strategizing layoffs and approving expenditures for services.

Birchall has been involved in acquiring a property in Austin, Texas, for the mothers of Musk's children to live in and offering secrecy agreements in exchange for large sums of money.

Birchall incorporated Musk's artificial intelligence (AI) company xAI in 2023, where he is listed as secretary of the company. He is also the CFO of the firm. In 2025, xAI brought in Mike Liberatore as CFO, but Birchall was reportedly still involved in financial decisions at the company, including raising new funds.

Following Donald Trump's victory in the 2024 United States presidential election, in which Musk was a major financial backer, Birchall has advised the Trump transition team on space policy and artificial intelligence, contributed to the formation of councils for AI development and cryptocurrency policy, and interviewed several candidates for positions at the United States Department of State.

== Personal life ==
Birchall is married and has five children. He is a practicing Latter-day Saint. He moved to Austin, Texas, in 2020. Prior to relocation, he lived in Stevenson Ranch, California, where he was a counselor to the local church's bishop.

== See also ==
- Frank William Gay, an LDS member who was a corporate aide to Howard Hughes
- Alex Spiro, an attorney who is considered to be among Elon Musk's inner circle
