= Building America's Future =

American political nonprofit

- Formation: 2021; 5 years ago
- Type: 501(c)(3) organization
- Tax ID no.: 85-1359192
- Headquarters: Washington, D.C.
- President: Chris Jankowski
- Executive director: Katherine Neal
- Key people: Elon Musk
- Website: buildingamericasfuture.com

Building America's Future is a political non-profit organization funded by Elon Musk actively supporting Donald Trump and other Republican candidates in the 2024 United States elections.

== History ==
Building America's Future ran an ad during the 2024 Republican Party presidential debate in Miami which claimed that an “E-ZPass lane for whales in the Gulf” implemented by Joe Biden was responsible for high gas prices.

During the early stages of the 2024 election, Building America's Future targeted black voters in South Carolina with mailers encouraging them not to vote for Joe Biden.

In April 2024, Building America's Future took out ads in Kansas, Mississippi, and Missouri which promoted the immigration policies of Glenn Youngkin.

In October 2024, the group hosted an event in Drexel Hill, Pennsylvania headlined by Donald Trump and Mike Huckabee.

In 2025 Building America's Future became involved in the race for Wisconsin Supreme Court, spending more than $1.6 million on messaging backing Brad Schimel.

== Operations ==
=== Progress 2028 ===
Progress 2028 was a disinformation campaign which presented itself as a progressive Kamala Harris–backed alternative to Project 2025 when it was actually fully controlled by Building America's Future. An entity called Progress 2028 was registered by Building America's Future on September 26, 2024. An associated website and ad campaign were rolled out days later.

The effort was described as a "false-flag" operation intended to reduce the Harris vote. Andrew Romeo, a strategist for Building America's Future, told the Washington Post, “People were upset on both sides of the aisle on it, said it was dishonest, disingenuous, we shouldn’t be running ads that look like Harris’s. But it worked and the numbers are undeniable."

=== Future Coalition PAC ===
The Future Coalition PAC is entirely funded by Building America's Future. In 2024, the Future Coalition PAC ran contradictory ads: they ran ads in Michigan which accused Kamala Harris of being pro-Israel, and ads in Pennsylvania accusing her of being pro-Palestinian. The ads were criticized as antisemitic, particularly in their portrayal of her husband Doug Emhoff.

=== Stand for US PAC ===
The Stand for US PAC is primarily funded by Building America's Future. Stand for US PAC has gotten involved in Missouri backing Jay Ashcroft in the Governor's race there, with a series of ads attacking his opponent Mike Kehoe.

== Leadership ==
In 2023, the group's president was Chris Jankowski and its executive director was Katherine Neal.

== Funding ==
The group had $11 million in revenue in 2021 and $53 million in revenue in 2022. Elon Musk began contributing to the group in 2022.

== See also ==
- America PAC
- Citizens for Sanity
- RBG PAC
