= America First Legal =

Legal advocacy organization in the United States

America First Legal Foundation
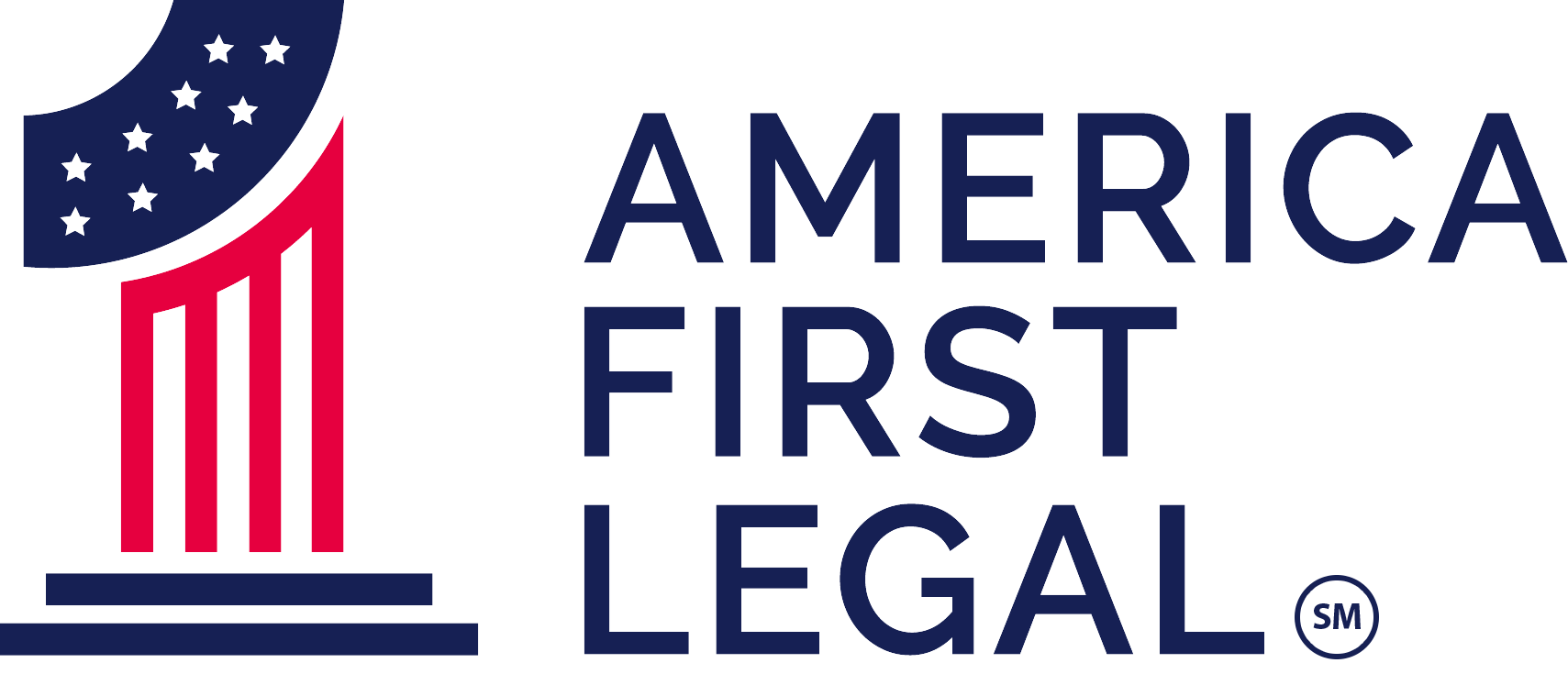
- Formation: April 6, 2021; 5 years ago
- Founders: Stephen Miller
- Type: 501(c)(3) nonprofit organization
- Tax ID no.: 86-2190372
- Purpose: Public interest law
- Headquarters: 611 Pennsylvania Avenue, Washington, D.C., U.S.
- Key people: Stephen Miller (president); Gene Hamilton (vice president); Matthew Whitaker (executive director)
- Website: aflegal.org

America First Legal Foundation (AFL) is an American 501(c)(3) nonprofit conservative public interest organization founded in 2021 by Stephen Miller.

== Organization ==
=== Leadership ===
America First Legal is led by a president, vice president, and executive director. Stephen Miller, the current senior advisor to President Donald Trump, is the organization's founder and president. The vice president is Gene Hamilton, a Department of Justice official under Trump, and the executive director is Matthew Whitaker, the acting U.S. attorney general under Trump following the resignation of Jeff Sessions. America First Legal's board of directors includes Whitaker and former chief of staff for Trump, Mark Meadows.

=== Positions ===
America First Legal is a conservative legal entity that focuses on administrative law and executive overreach in response to litigation during the Trump administration, including legal challenges to the Trump travel ban, an attempt to ban TikTok, and barring migrants from seeking asylum. The organization has filed lawsuits regarding diversity, equity, and inclusion, Title 42 expulsions, the First Amendment and social media services, Title IX and transgender people, and affirmative action. In January 2023, the organization joined a lawsuit led by Texas attorney general Ken Paxton claiming a federal migrant parole program was unlawful.

In October 2022, America First Legal sent flyers to voters in Colorado's 8th congressional district that were characterized as transphobic by the Queer and Trans People of Color Program of the Latino Action Council. During the 2022 elections, the organization became involved in legal efforts relating to claims of apparent voter fraud in the election. Flyers obtained by The New York Times targeted Asian Americans with anti-affirmative action messaging. America First Legal ran advertisements accusing the Biden administration of "anti-white bigotry", spending US$5 million on radio advertisements, second to the Senate Leadership Fund. Following Trump's federal indictment on charges of retaining classified documents, the organization sent out fundraising emails.

Until July 2024, America First Legal was a member of the advisory board of Project 2025, a collection of conservative and right-wing policy proposals from The Heritage Foundation to reshape the United States federal government and consolidate executive power should the Republican nominee win the 2024 presidential election.

== History ==
In March 2021, Politico reported that Stephen Miller, the former senior advisor to president Donald Trump, began forming America First Legal after Trump's loss in the 2020 presidential election. According to Politico, Miller consulted the Conservative Partnership Institute and lawyer Ken Starr, who authored the Starr Report that led to the impeachment of Bill Clinton, and requested funding from Chicago Cubs co-owner Todd Ricketts. Miller launched America First Legal on April 6, 2021. The name refers to America First, an isolationist policy observed by the United States and reinterpreted by Trump as a political slogan.

America First Legal represented white farmers in Texas who sought to undo debt relief for socially disadvantaged farmers and ranchers as part of the American Rescue Plan Act. In June 2021, judge Marcia Morales Howard issued a preliminary injunction halting the Department of Agriculture's loan program. Judge Matthew Kacsmaryk ruled in America First Legal's favor in November 2022 that the Affordable Care Act does not prohibit discrimination on the basis of sexual orientation and gender identity.

Political action committee Citizens for Sanity is run by America First Legal employees.

In December 2024, America First Legal published photos of President Joe Biden and his son Hunter Biden meeting with Chinese businessmen and officials in 2013. The photos were obtained from the National Archives and Records Administration after ongoing litigation by America First Legal. The photos show Joe Biden introducing Hunter to General Secretary of the Chinese Communist Party Xi Jinping, former Chinese Vice President Li Yuanchao, and officials from BHR Partners. Joe Biden has stated he was not financially involved in his son's business matters.
