= Phil Cox =

American political operative (born c. 1974)

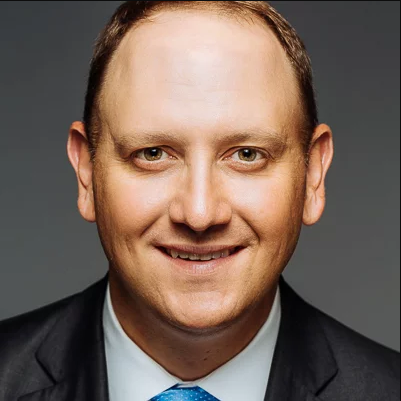
- Phil Cox in 2018
- Born: 1974 (age 51–52)
- Education: University of Virginia
- Occupation: Political operative
- Years active: 1997 - present
- Political party: Republican

Phil Cox (born c. 1974) is an American long-time political operative. He acted as the campaign manager or senior strategist to Republican campaigns and super-pacs for Congress, Governor, U.S. Senate, and President. He was Director of the Republican Governors Association. He co-founded 50 State, a bipartisan, state-focused government affairs firm, co-founder of GuidePostStrategies, a federal government affairs firm, Chairman of IMGE, a digital marketing firm, and partner at P2, a public affairs firm.

== Early life and education ==
Phil Cox was born in 1974.

== Career ==
Cox graduated from the University of Virginia in 1996. From 1997 to 2001 Cox worked on a series of Virginia General Assembly campaigns, eventually helping to elect more than two dozen members. In 2001 he served as Campaign Manager for Lieutenant Governor John Hager’s campaign for Governor, and in 2005 helped direct Bob McDonnell’s successful campaign for Attorney General.

From 2002 to 2005, Cox helped direct communications and fundraising for the Mercatus Center at George Mason University, and from 2006 – 2008 worked alongside Tim Phillips at Americans for Prosperity, directing its fundraising, state chapter development, and issue campaigns.

=== Republican Governors, 2009-2014 ===
In 2009, Cox served as Campaign Manager for Virginia Attorney General Bob McDonnell’s in his campaign for Governor. A year after Barack Obama won Virginia by 7 points, McDonnell enjoyed a 17-point victory over Creigh Deeds, resulting in a sweep of all three statewide offices. Following that victory, McDonnell appointed Cox as his Transition Director.

In 2010, Mississippi Governor Haley Barbour, Chairman of the Republican Governors Association, hired Cox to help oversee the RGA’s political engagement in a half dozen states, including the expensive battlegrounds of Pennsylvania and Florida.

From 2011-2014, Phil served as Executive Director of the Republican Governors Association, the senior political adviser to the 31 Republican Governors. During this period the RGA directed more than $250 million in support to candidates in all 50 states. During Cox's tenure, the RGA strengthened its majority, electing 31 Republican governors, with notable wins in traditional Democratic-leaning states like Massachusetts, Maryland, Illinois, and Maine.

Following the 2014 cycle, The Boston Globe called him “a force for the GOP,” The Washington Times “a Republican Kingmaker," and Politico named him one of its “50 Politicos to Watch.”

In 2015–2016, Cox founded and directed "America Leads", which was the presidential Super-PAC supporting New Jersey Governor Chris Christie.

In 2018, Cox served as chairman and senior advisor to super-PACs in support of candidates for governor and U.S. Senate, and managed independent expenditure campaigns on behalf of the RGA in a handful of governors races, including the only pick-up of the cycle in Alaska.

In 2019, Cox served as co-chair for "Trade Works for America", a national campaign, which helped pass the USMCA trade agreement, making a number of public and national media appearances.

=== 50 State, GuidePost Strategies, P2 Public Affairs, IMGE, America PAC ===
In 2014, Cox partnered with former Democratic Governors Association Executive Director Colm O'Comartun to form "50 State", a bipartisan, state-focused government affairs firm serving corporations, trade associations, and national non-profit organizations.

After President Donald Trump's election in 2016, Cox founded "GuidePost Strategies", a federally-focused government and public affairs firm, along with former RGA Policy Director Marie Sanderson. In 2018, former White House Legislative Director, Marc Short, joined GuidePost as a partner.

Cox is a founding partner of P2 Public Affairs, a specialized communications and strategy firm that runs advocacy campaigns across the nation and in Washington, D.C.

As of 2018, Cox served as chairman of the Board of IMGE, a digital consulting and marketing firm.

Cox also has served on the board of directors for the "Senate Leadership Fund", on the board of directors for WinRed, on the Board of Advisors for N2 America, and is a member of the Public Policy Council for The Michael J. Fox Foundation, which is a leader in the fight against Parkinson's disease.

Cox has appeared on CNBC, Fox Business, C-SPAN, NPR, and the Hugh Hewitt Show and is frequently cited for political commentary and analysis in national publications.

In July 2024, he took a leadership position at America PAC, the PAC founded by Elon Musk to support Donald Trump's 2024 presidential campaign.

== Personal life ==
As of 2016 Cox lived in McLean, Virginia, with his wife and two children.
