= ClassDojo =

Classroom management software company

- Website type: Private
- Founded: August 2011; 15 years ago
- Founders: Sam Chaudhary; Liam Don
- Industry: Education
- Products: Educational technology
- Employees: 40 (2019)
- Website: classdojo.com

ClassDojo is an educational technology company. It connects primary school teachers, students and families through communication features, such as a feed for photos and videos from the school day, and messaging that can be translated into more than 130 languages. It also enables teachers to note feedback on students' skills and creates a portfolio for students, so that families can be aware of school activities outside of meeting with teachers.

According to ClassDojo, its app is used by teachers, children and families in 95% of pre-kindergarten through eighth grade schools in the United States, as well in a further 180 countries. ClassDojo is an alum of Y Combinator's Ed-tech division, and was launched in August 2011 by Sam Chaudhary and Liam Don from the ImagineK12 education seed accelerator.

== History ==
ClassDojo is a site for kids and parents to connect with teachers moved from London in tech accelerator, ImagineK12. Chaudhary and Don met and listened to hundreds of teachers to understand their views on how to improve education. The pair released the first version of ClassDojo in July 2011 to help teachers to build a positive classroom culture through a feedback app. In its first week of release, 80 teachers used ClassDojo.

Within a year of launch, the platform was used by 9.6 million teachers and students, in more than 30 countries. In 2013, ClassDojo began offering the platform in native languages other than English. In 2014, ClassDojo added a messaging function to its platform, allowing teachers and families to communicate through instant messaging while hiding phone numbers. It included a feature known as ClassDojo Translate, which automatically translates messages into more than 35 languages for teachers and parents to be able to communicate when they have different primary languages.

In August 2015, ClassDojo added Class Story, a digital stream of pictures and videos from the classroom, accessible to parents and students connected to that class. This was followed by Student Stories, digital portfolios for students to interact with classmates and share their experiences with their parents. In 2016, the company added School Story, which enables school administration and teachers to create a stream of school-related pictures and videos for everyone connected to the school.

In January 2016, ClassDojo partnered with Stanford University's Project for Education Research That Scales (PERTS) lab, to release a five-part series of educational videos discussing growth mindset. In September 2016, it was reported that the series had been viewed by one of every four kids in American classrooms. In October 2016, ClassDojo produced a second video series on empathy, in partnership with the Making Caring Common Project at Harvard Graduate School of Education. In May 2017, the company, through a partnership with the Yale Center for Emotional Intelligence, released a third video series on mindfulness curriculum.

In September 2018, ClassDojo partnered with Elon Musk's Ad Astra private school to develop "Conundrums", a set of open-ended critical thinking and ethics challenges for elementary and middle school students. In May 2019, in partnership with Yale, ClassDojo held "the first-ever global mindfulness lesson" of exercises and breathing activities in 180 countries.

=== Funding ===
In August 2012, ClassDojo announced it had raised $1.6 million of main seed capital from Paul Graham, SV Angel, SoftTech VC, Mitch Kapor, Lerer Ventures, and General Catalyst Partners. In March 2014, the company announced an $8.5 million in a series A round of funding, led by Shasta Ventures. In late 2015, ClassDojo raised $21 million in a series B round of funding led by General Catalyst Partners. In February 2018, the company raised a $35 million Series C funding round co-led by GSV and SignalFire. On July 21, 2022, ClassDojo announced its Series D funding round at a pre-money valuation of $1.1B, led by Tencent. It has raised about $191.1 million in funding to date.

== Technology ==
ClassDojo allows students, teachers and families to communicate. To use ClassDojo, teachers register for a free account and create "classes" with their students. They can give students feedback for various skills in class. These are customizable, and teachers can change the skills to adapt to the needs of the class or of the school. Teachers have the option to post pictures and videos onto their class's story, or to their school story. They can also message with families, receiving 'read receipts' to know when their messages have been read.

Students do not need to download ClassDojo or create an account. If they choose to, they get an access code from the teacher; after creating an account, the students can customize their avatar, add photos and videos to their portfolio, and view the 'Story' for each of their classes.

Families can also access ClassDojo when they are invited by their child's teacher, and receive updates on what's happening in school, view their whole class's story and see a timeline of their own child's experiences in the classroom through pictures and videos. In October 2018, the company released its first paid product, an optional subscription service for families called 'ClassDojo Beyond School'. This is a bundle of at-home learning for children that their local school might not be able to offer.

ClassDojo is available as a web application that can be used on any device with a web browser, and also as a native application for iPhone (iOS) and Android. The company keeps ClassDojo free for teachers, so no child is at a disadvantage regardless of their school.

== Recognition ==
In 2011, ClassDojo received the Today Show's Education Innovation Award. The founders of the company were included on the Forbes "30 Under 30: Education" list in 2012. In 2013, Forbes recognized ClassDojo as one of the "100 Most Promising Companies of the United States". That same year, Fast Company included the company on its "10 Most Innovative Education Companies in the World" list. In 2014, ClassDojo was awarded TechCrunch's Crunchie Award for Best Education Startup. In 2015, its founders were included on Inc.'s "30 Under 30" list. In 2016, Fast Company recognized the ClassDojo app as one of "The 35 Most Innovative Apps of the Year". In 2017, Inc. named ClassDojo one of the "25 Most Disruptive Companies" of the year. In 2019, the company was awarded the "Best of British Technology" Award.

=== Criticism ===
In 2017, the London School of Economics released a blog post about student data protection and mental health in regard to using classroom apps such as ClassDojo. It claimed that ClassDojo could collect sensitive student behavior data, and questioned whether parents would be informed if the data was stored or sold. The researchers considered these apps to be a form of social media that could affect children's mental health by creating a classroom climate where students face constant competition for a teacher's attention, and behavior is individualized to discount larger social and environmental influences.

ClassDojo has also been criticized for teaching "students to understand life as being inseparable from digital technology, and...normalizes both surveillance and the kind of isolating individualism that can cause mental illness." Teachers have noted a rise in aggressive emails from parents due to convenience of the app.

According to teachers, using ClassDojo's features "has helped demystify" what happens in the classroom for parents. In the United States, one out of every six families with a child in elementary or middle school uses ClassDojo's app on a daily basis, and there is at least one teacher using the tool in 95 percent of U.S. elementary and middle schools. The features within the app have been compared to a private, ad-free version of Snapchat and Instagram stories, as well as being called the "Netflix for education".
