= Vote.gov =

U.S. government website

- Available in: 20 languages
- List of languages English, Spanish, Amharic, Arabic, Bengali, Chinese (Traditional & Simplified), French, Haitian Creole, Hindi, Japanese, Khmer, Korean, Navajo, Portuguese, Russian, Somali, Tagalog, Vietnamese, Yupʼik-Akuzipik
- Headquarters: Washington, D.C., U.S.
- Country of origin: United States
- Area served: United States
- Owner: General Services Administration (U.S. government)
- Industry: U.S. government
- Services: Voting information
- Website: vote.gov
- Launched: October 2, 2015 (11 years ago)
- Current status: Live

Vote.gov is a website of the government of the United States which provides information to potential voters, including links to voter-registration resources in their respective states.

== History ==
It was launched on October 2, 2015, by USA.gov, a division of the U.S. General Services Administration's Office of Citizen Services and Innovative Technologies, as vote.usa.gov, with the support of 18F. On National Voter Registration Day 2016, the website was updated with full translation into Spanish as well as compliance with web standards.

In March 2021, President Biden issued Executive Order 14019 on Promoting Access to Voting, which tasked GSA with modernizing and improving the user experience of Vote.gov. By 2024, further interagency partnerships expanded, including with the Election Assistance Commission, the Department of State's Bureau of Consular Affairs, Federal Student Aid, United States Citizenship and Immigration Services, and the Cybersecurity and Infrastructure Security Agency.

Taylor Swift's Instagram post in September 2024 endorsing Kamala Harris's 2024 presidential campaign also directed her followers to vote.gov, resulting in over 300,000 unique visits to the site in the hours after her post.
