= Crunchies =

Former technology industry awards

The Crunchies was an industry award given out from 2007 to 2017 by several technology blogs to the Silicon Valley companies and venture capitalists they cover.

The awards have been sponsored and co-hosted by blogs such as GigaOm, TechCrunch, VentureBeat, and ReadWriteWeb (which no longer participates), and tabulated from votes on their sites. Awards have been given out at ceremonies at various theaters in San Francisco, California.

The award, a plastic sculpture of a primate standing on top of a computer with a bone in his hand, is a reference to the opening scenes of 2001: A Space Odyssey, or possibly to a scene spoofing that movie in Zoolander.

On November 9, 2017, Techcrunch announced that the award show would be ending as part of the streamlining of operations by parent owner Verizon Communications.
