= Political activities of Elon Musk =

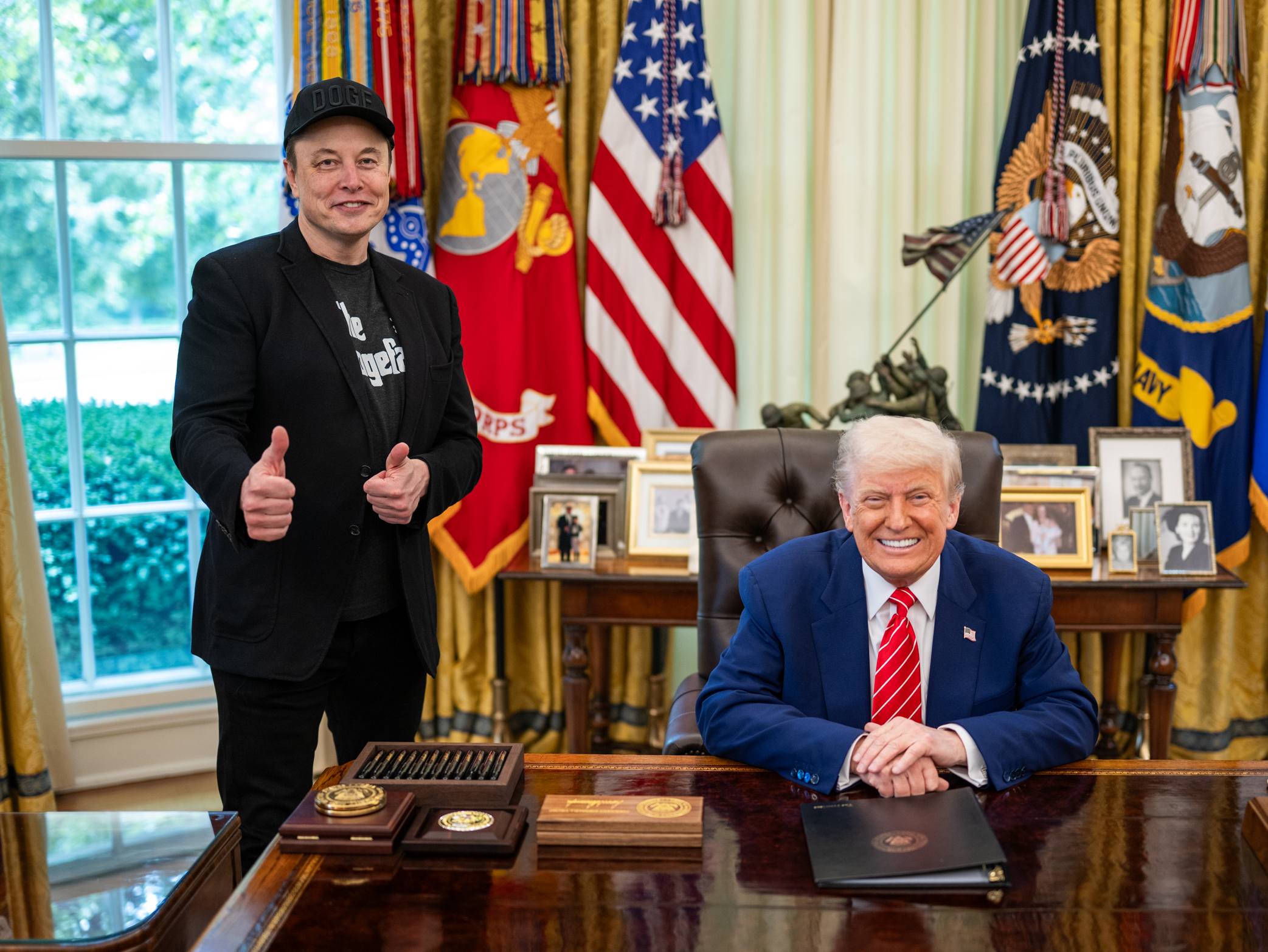
Elon Musk with president Donald Trump in the Oval Office in May 2025

Elon Musk has been actively involved in politics, particularly in the United States and Europe, throughout the majority of his business career. Despite historically donating to and voting for both Democrats and Republicans, his political contributions have since shifted almost entirely to right-wing candidates and politicians, outright stating in 2022 that he would no longer support Democrats. In the time since, Musk has become more vocal about his views, frequently promoting falsehoods about election fraud. As a result, he has been described as conservative, although he rejects the label and calls himself a moderate.

Musk played a significant role in the 2024 United States presidential election by establishing a political action committee (PAC) in support of Donald Trump for his campaign, making him the election's largest donor with over US$277 million.

Following Trump's 2024 victory, Musk was appointed to co-run a new temporary government organization popularly known as the Department of Government Efficiency (DOGE), serving until May 2025, when Musk departed from the Department.

In 2024, he started supporting international far-right political parties, activists, and causes. A February 2025 NBC News analysis found he had boosted far-right political movements to cut immigration and curtail regulation of business in at least 18 countries on six continents since 2023. His international political activities have been scrutinized, particularly in Europe, with some saying his actions and comments appear as "foreign interference" in domestic affairs. Musk's comments and actions have received increasing criticism from some of the governments and leaders of European countries, in particular regarding his support of Alternative for Germany during the 2025 German federal elections.

== United States ==
Musk became a U.S. citizen in 2002, founding SpaceX that year using his share of the profits from PayPal's sale to eBay. From 2008 to 2013, Musk flew to Washington, D.C. forty times, according to biographer Ashlee Vance. At a Vanity Fair event with Y Combinator president Sam Altman in 2015, Musk said he was "involved in politics as little as possible". Prior to the 2016 United States presidential election, Musk donated to Hillary Clinton and later said he voted for her. In November 2016, Musk criticized Donald Trump as "not the right guy" in an interview with CNBC. The following month, Trump appointed Musk to his Strategic and Policy Forum. Musk later endorsed Trump for the 2024 United States presidential election.

A 2012 report from the Sunlight Foundation, a nonpartisan group that tracks government spending, found that since 2002, SpaceX had spent more than $4 million on lobbying the United States Congress and more than $800,000 in political contributions to Democrats and Republicans. As for Musk specifically, the same report said that "SpaceX's campaign to win political support has been systematic and sophisticated," and that "unlike most tech-startups, SpaceX has maintained a significant lobbying presence in Washington almost since day 1" and that "Musk himself has donated roughly $725,000 to various campaigns since 2002. In 2004, he contributed $2,000 to President George W. Bush's reelection campaign, maxing out (over $100,000) to Barack Obama's reelection campaign and donated $5,000 to Republican Sen. Marco Rubio, who represents Florida, a state critical to the space industry. [...] All told, Musk and SpaceX gave out roughly $250,000 in the 2012 election cycle."

In 2017, Musk made his public first entry into major American politics, speaking at the National Governors Association at the invitation of Brian Sandoval.

By January 2017, Musk had met with Trump at Trump Tower to argue for the SpaceX Mars colonization program. That month, he told Gizmodo that he was among several "voices of reason" for Trump. In June, he resigned from his positions on Trump's advisory councils after the United States withdrew from the Paris Agreement. Musk donated US$50,000 to an organization benefiting Republican members of the House of Representatives and an additional US$38,900 to a separate group ahead of the 2018 House of Representatives elections, defending his decision in order to "maintain dialogue". The following year, he offered an endorsement of Andrew Yang's presidential campaign and tacitly supported Kanye West's campaign in the 2020 presidential election, but said that he attempted to convince West to postpone his campaign in an interview with Maureen Dowd.

Speaking to Kara Swisher in September 2020, Musk considered voting for Trump if Joe Biden was not a viable candidate, though he later said he voted for Biden. In May 2022, Musk stated that the Democratic Party had become the "party of division and hate" and that he would vote for Republicans, later urging voters vote for Republicans in that year's midterm elections in order to counter a Democratic presidency.

In October 2024, The Wall Street Journal reported that Musk had given over US$50 million to Citizens for Sanity, a political organization that targeted Democrats on issues such as medical care for transgender children and illegal immigration. He publicly endorsed Ron DeSantis in his presidential campaign the following year, hosting DeSantis in a Twitter Spaces event that was marred by technical issues. In August 2023, entrepreneur Vivek Ramaswamy suggested that Musk should serve as a presidential advisor for his presidential bid. That fall he supported Republican Ron DeSantis for the 2024 US presidential election, giving $10 million to his campaign in 2023, and hosted DeSantis's campaign announcement on a Twitter Spaces event. In January 2024, Musk participated in a forum with Democratic presidential primary challenger, Representative Dean Phillips regarding his presidential bid.

Musk and his son, X Æ A-XII, with Donald Trump in the Oval Office on February 11, 2025.

According to The Washington Post, Musk expressed support for Trump at an event hosted by businessman Nelson Peltz. In March 2024, The New York Times reported that he had met Trump at Mar-a-Lago; Musk believed that Biden should be defeated in the 2024 presidential election at the time. Approximately thirty minutes after a would-be assassin shot and wounded Trump at a campaign rally near Butler, Pennsylvania, in July, Musk endorsed Trump. He congratulated Trump's decision to name senator JD Vance of Ohio as his running mate.

During the transition period after Trump was re-elected, Musk became omnipresent at Mar-a-Lago, where his activities led The Washington Post to refer to him as "somewhere between unofficial co-president and 'first buddy'". In December, after Musk helped to kill a government funding bill, his outsize influence led some politicians and political commentators to start calling him "President Musk", or variants like "Shadow President Elon Musk". AI-generated images using this theme circulated on social media, such as one showing Musk being inaugurated while Trump held the bible on which Musk took his oath. Another, titled "President Musk", showed Trump as a puppet and Musk as the puppeteer. Cartoonists also created works with Musk as president, accompanied by Trump. He has been regarded as an éminence grise by various sources.

Musk attended Trump's inauguration in the United States Capitol rotunda with his son X Æ A-Xii, seated in close proximity to Trump. After the inauguration, he spoke at Trump's inaugural rally at Capital One Arena. During his speech, Musk clasped his right hand against his chest and raised out his arm above his head with his palm facing down, and turned around to perform the gesture to the audience behind him before saying, "My heart goes out to you." The gesture led to an unresolved controversy over whether or not he was giving a Nazi salute.

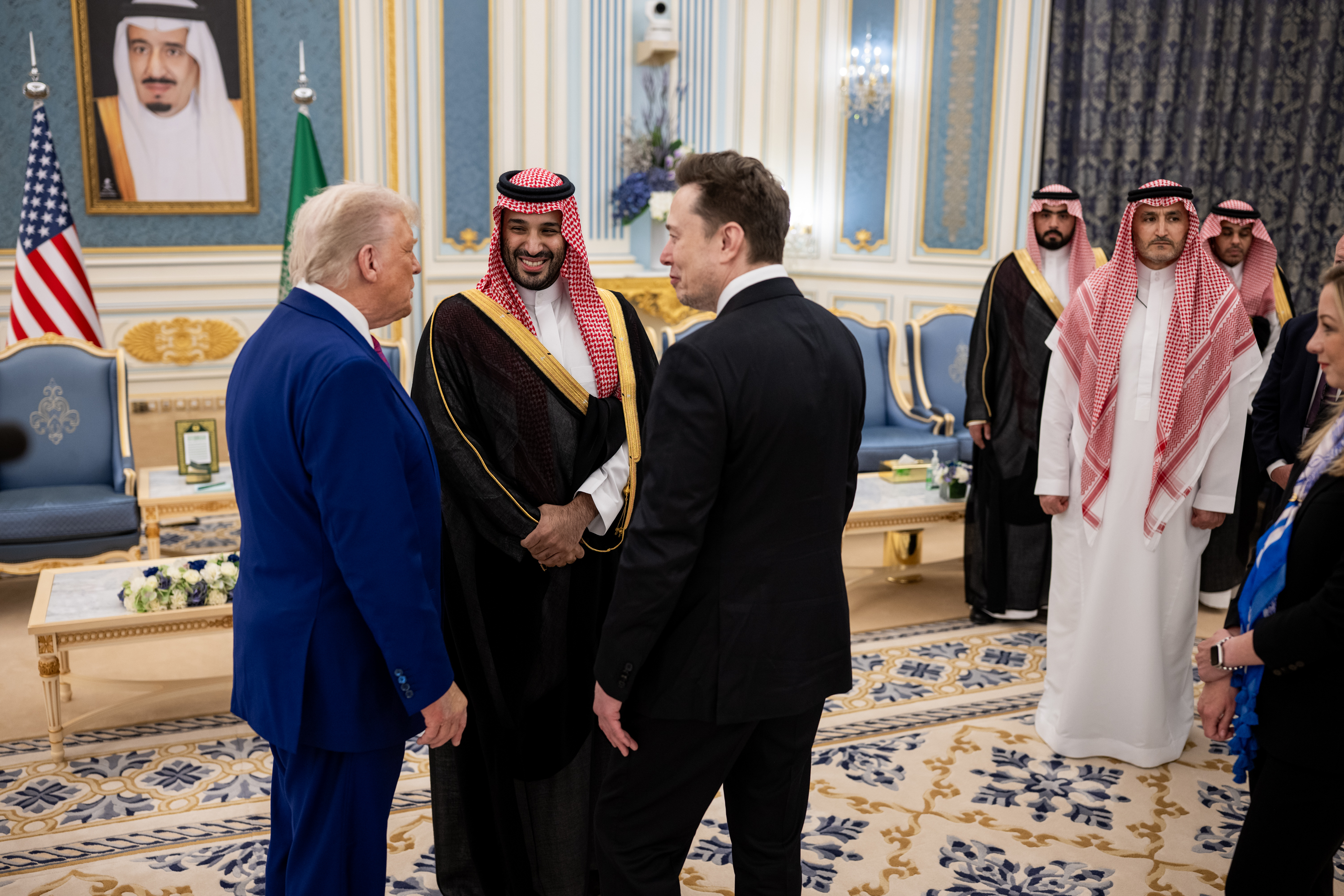
Musk with President Trump and Saudi Crown Prince Mohammed bin Salman during Trump's visit to the Middle East in May 2025

In February 2025, Musk attended the Conservative Political Action Conference. Argentine President Javier Milei gave Musk a chainsaw, which is a symbol that Milei has used in campaigns for cutting public spending.

In April 2025, Musk engaged in a very public dispute over tariffs with other figures in the Trump administration, particularly Peter Navarro who Musk called "truly a moron" and "dumber than a sack of bricks". Navarro had labeled Tesla a "car assembler" as opposed to a car manufacturer and dismissed Musk's opinions on tariffs as self interest. When asked to comment on the dispute Press Secretary Karoline Leavitt responded "Boys will be boys, and we will let their public sparring continue."

In September 2025, Musk called the Anti-Defamation League a "hate group" and accused it of being anti-Christian in nature.

=== Political action committees ===
In June 2024, The New York Times revealed that a super PAC known as America PAC had spent at least US$6.6 million since the May 2024 to support Trump in the 2024 election. A website had been established collecting voters' information and encouraging them to vote. The Wall Street Journal reported in July that Musk said he would commit a monthly donation of US$45 million to the super PAC; after the Journal published its article, Musk disputed its accuracy.

In October, a political action committee known as RBG PAC, in reference to the deceased Supreme Court justice Ruth Bader Ginsburg, spent at least US$20 million on advertisements associating Trump with Ginsburg and her pro-abortion stance, according to a Federal Election Commission (FEC) filing. Clara Spera, Ginsburg's granddaughter, criticized the group in a statement; Ginsburg denounced Trump in an interview with The New York Times in 2016 and did not want to be replaced on the Court until Trump was out of office. An FEC filing in December revealed that Musk was RBG PAC's only donor, with a contribution of $20.5 million.

By the end of Trump's presidential campaign, Musk had spent $291 million supporting Trump and allied Republicans, making the largest individual political donor of the 2024 election and the largest individual political donor since at least 2010 outside of candidates funding their own campaigns. Musk's donations primarily went to his super PAC, America PAC. Musk also launched a $1 million a day giveaway for swing state voters the Justice Department warned could potentially violate federal election laws.

One of the Musk-backed super PAC's, Building America's Future, spent $45 million in so-called "false flag" ads, intended to look like they come from a progressive Harris-backed organization, while deceptively describing policies Harris did not support. Anthony Romeo, a strategist for Building America's Future told the Washington Post, “People were upset on both sides of the aisle on it, said it was dishonest, disingenuous, we shouldn’t be running ads that look like Harris’s. But it worked and the numbers are undeniable."

In March 2025, Musk and Building America's Future poured considerable ad money into the Wisconsin Supreme Court judge race, favoring Trump Republican Brad Schimel over Democrat Susan Crawford, a race expected to be the most expensive state supreme court race ever. Again, the PAC ran deceptive advertisements intended to appear as though they came from Democrats. Crawford subsequently defeated Schimel in the election.

Musk was the largest individual donor in the 2026 United States elections, spending over $474 million in support of Republican candidates, including $216 million to America PAC, $168 million to the Senate Leadership Fund, $30 million to the Congressional Leadership Fund, $10 million to Lone Star Liberty PAC, $10 million to the Republican Governors Association, and $2 million to the Republican Attorneys General Association.

=== Department of Government Efficiency ===
On August 12, 2024, Musk held a discussion on X Spaces with Trump in which he suggested a "government efficiency commission" that he would serve on to ensure taxes were spent appropriately, an idea that Trump supported. The following month, The Washington Post reported that Trump had discussed the concept of a commission, led by business executives, to regulate government spending. At a speech before the Economic Club of New York that month, Trump publicly called for a commission to audit the federal government that would be led by Musk. After his victory in the 2024 election in November, Trump announced that he would establish the Department of Government Efficiency and appoint Musk and entrepreneur Vivek Ramaswamy to lead it. Prior to its formation, ideological differences between the men led to Ramaswamy, who will enter the 2026 Ohio gubernatorial election, exiting the initiative.

In the days leading up to Trump's inauguration, representatives from the Department of Government Efficiency were sent to several federal agencies. By the inauguration, Musk had received a government email address and was prepared to begin working in the West Wing, according to The New York Times; prior reporting had indicated Musk would operate the Department of Government Efficiency from the Eisenhower Executive Office Building, but he had objected to an apparent lessened level of access with Trump. In an executive order Trump signed after his inauguration, the United States Digital Service was renamed to the United States DOGE Service and a temporary organization was established beneath the DOGE Service. Each federal agency was to be assigned a "DOGE team" of special government employees, a classification of temporary workers.

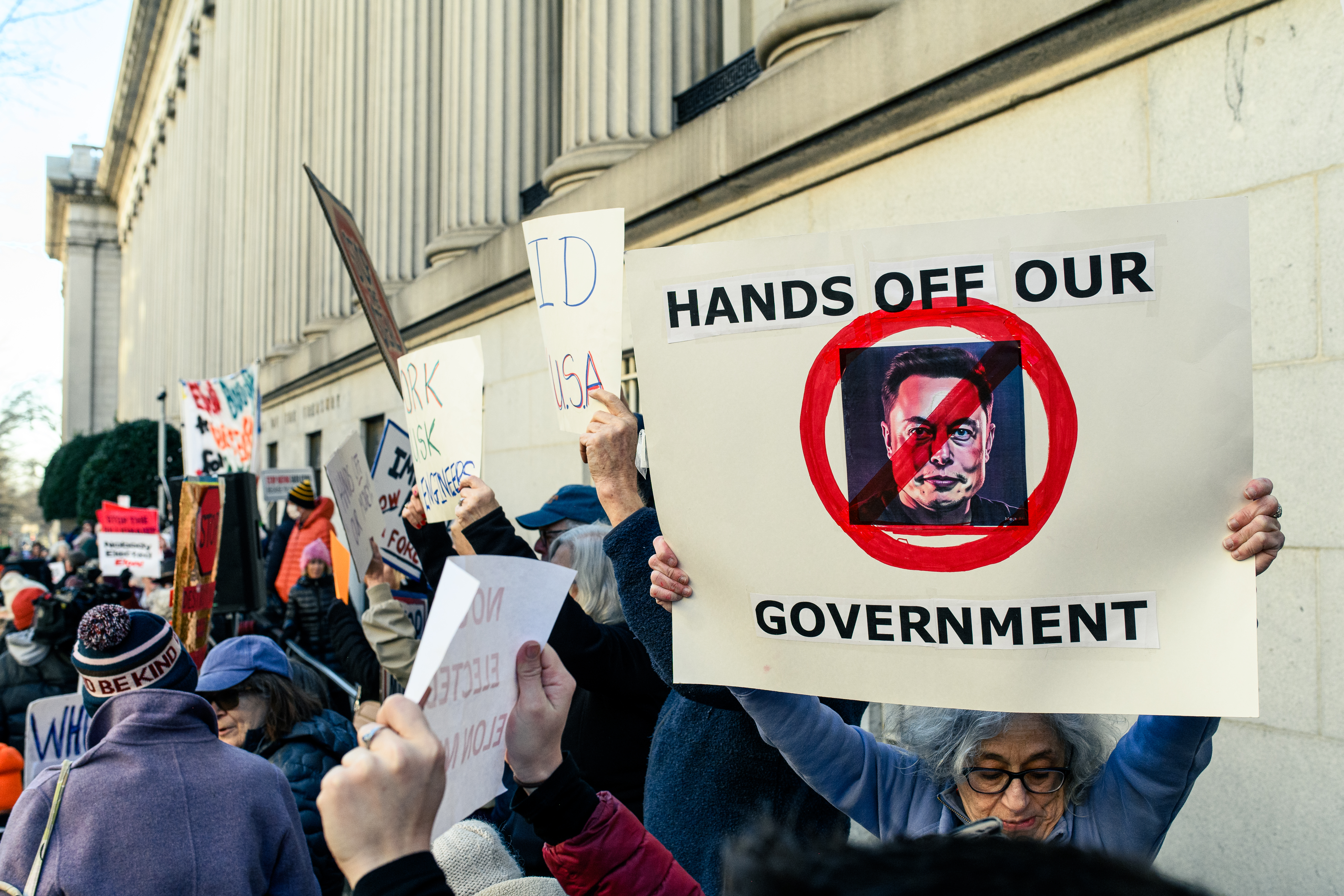
The "We Choose to Fight: Nobody Elected Elon" protest, organized by MoveOn, was held on February 4, 2025.

Several US Congress members spoke against Musk's role in the government during the "We Choose to Fight: Nobody Elected Elon" protests.

DOGE has reportedly taken over agencies and gained access to sensitive data, including the Treasury department, Office of Personnel Management and General Services Administration. DOGE has also reportedly shut down the USAID. Musk claimed credit for the shutdown of the agency, saying that he and his colleagues "spent the weekend feeding USAID into the woodchipper." Potentially violating the Impoundment Control Act, Musk also boasted on X of shutting down payments that were approved by Congress.

In a call hosted on X on February 3 with senators Joni Ernst and Mike Lee, Musk proposed the non-enforcement or repeal of all federal regulations as a default position of the Trump administration.

After Musk took questions about DOGE in the Oval Office on February 11, sometimes holding his four year-old son on his shoulders, cartoonists portrayed Musk holding Trump on his shoulders like a child. The February 24 Time magazine cover portrayed Musk sitting behind the Resolute desk as if he were president.

Musk would depart from the U.S. government on May 30, 2025.

=== America Party ===
In July 2025, Musk announced the creation of a new political party, the America Party, widely seen as a rebuke to president Donald Trump as part of his feud with Trump. Musk stated that the new party would focus on deficit reduction and initially target just a few significant political races. He has advocated for the party to be fiscally conservative. Musk has remained vague on specifics about the platform, with pundits claiming the party's platform will just be his personal views.

In August 2025, Musk reportedly reconsidered the formation of the party and contemplated backing JD Vance in the 2028 presidential election.

==== History ====
Avatar of Elon Musk

Elon Musk
(@elonmusk)
tweeted:

Is it time to create a new political party in America that actually represents the 80% in the middle?

Yes	80.4%
No	19.6%
5,630,775 votes · Final results

June 5, 2025

Following the 2024 United States presidential election, a feud between Musk and Trump began in June 2025, over provisions in the then-proposed One Big Beautiful Bill Act. The dispute escalated on June 5 after Trump publicly criticized Musk in a meeting with German chancellor Friedrich Merz. Amid a series of posts on X chastising Trump, Musk proposed a political party to represent "the 80 percent in the middle", attaching a survey allowing users to vote "yes" or "no". The poll ended the following day with 80.4% of the 5.6 million respondents voting yes. Minutes after declaring that a party should be established based on the poll, Musk named it the "America Party".

Avatar of Elon Musk

Elon Musk
(@elonmusk)
tweeted:

Independence Day is the perfect time to ask if you want independence from the two-party (some would say uniparty) system!

Should we create the America Party?

Yes	65.4%
No	34.6%
1,248,856 votes · Final results

July 4, 2025

Prior to the party's announcement, several political parties and individuals in opposition to the two-party system attempted to garner Musk's support. In an interview with Politico Magazine, Andrew Yang sought to work with him to establish a political party together or to support Yang's Forward Party; Musk previously endorsed Yang in his 2020 presidential campaign. Libertarian National Committee chair Steven Nekhaila proposed a partnership with Musk in July.

According to Reuters, Musk was "serious" about establishing the America Party despite seeking a resolution with Trump and outreach from the Trump administration. As the One Big Beautiful Bill Act neared a vote in the Senate in late June, he vowed to form the America Party if the bill passed and promised to support primary challenges to Republicans who voted in favor of the bill; the One Big Beautiful Bill Act returned to the House of Representatives days later, where it passed on July 3 along largely party lines. Musk outlined a potential electoral strategy. He referred to both the Republican and Democratic parties as a "uniparty," criticizing them for failing to offer real alternatives.

In the days leading up to his announcement, Musk had discussed a political party with allies in conceptual—but not pragmatic—talks, according to The New York Times. On July 4, Musk held a second survey on X, asking if the American people wanted "independence from the two-party (some would say uniparty) system". The poll would end the following day on July 5, with 65.4% voting in favor of the new party. On the same day, Musk announced that he had established the America Party.

United Press International reported on July 5 that the party was not yet registered with the Federal Election Commission, which oversees U.S. federal elections. Several days later, Musk noted on X that one supposed filing was fake.

On July 6, it was announced that Mark Cuban and Anthony Scaramucci would be "interested" in supporting the party, and offering aid to get the party on state ballots. That same day, Treasury Secretary Scott Bessent stated that "I imagine that those boards of directors [of his companies] did not like [Musk's] announcement yesterday, and will be encouraging him to focus on his business activities, not his political activities."

In a July 7 post to Truth Social, Donald Trump said he was "saddened to watch Elon Musk go completely 'off the rails,' essentially becoming a TRAIN WRECK over the past five weeks."

On July 30, James Fishback, a Tesla investor, reported that the launch of the America Party had stalled and that Musk had neither filed with the FEC to form the new party, nor endorsed any candidates on the America Party ballot line.

The following month, Musk reportedly reconsidered the formation of the party, which would have been damaging to his relationship with the vice president, JD Vance.

==== Organization ====
Musk, who was born in South Africa, is ineligible to run for the presidency or the vice presidency of the United States under the provisions of the United States Constitution. He is eligible to run for other offices, such as United States senator or representative, as well as to be a political party chair. Musk has not stated who will be the party chair or the nature of its structure.

==== Electoral performance and strategy ====
Nate Cohn, a New York Times politics analyst, posited that the America Party could gain legitimacy in the 2028 elections if dissatisfaction with the two-party system mounted over dismal economic conditions incurred by Donald Trump and Joe Biden. Vox argued that Musk could negatively affect the Republican Party in the 2026 elections by focusing on competitive seats in the House of Representatives and the Senate, garnering a coalition of voters that lean futurist and technolibertarian.

The New York Times pointed out that, while "opinion polling has long shown that Americans are hungry for an option beyond the two major political parties", this has not translated into genuine support for third parties. Efforts by idealistic reformists to create a third party, including Ross Perot and his Reform Party in the 1990s, and the more recent Unite America and No Labels movements, as well as Andrew Yang's Forward Party, have all failed. In the same article, The New York Times also highlighted that Musk's claims of fundamentally reshaping American politics with a third party "suggest he had spent little time studying state ballot-access and federal campaign-finance laws" noting the "labyrinthine system" required for getting a name on a ballot in singular states let alone all 50 as well as pointing out the fact that New York has a ban on parties using the word "American" in their names. The New York Times concluded that it would've been easier, and cheaper, for Musk to attempt a hijacking of the Libertarian Party, which already has elements loyal to Musk, than to start his own political party.

MSNBC also stated that "Unlimited money won't make up for not understanding election laws, political science or American history" in regards to Musk's party, also pointing out that the best third-party performance in recent years was Gary Johnson in 2016 which earned 3.3% of the vote. MSNBC also pointed out Yang and the Forward Party, Perot and the Reform Party, and No Labels, while also pointing out the failed Unity '08 and 2012's Americans Elect campaigns alongside Robert F. Kennedy Jr.'s 2024 bid for President. MSNBC concluded that Musk is centering his entire party on winning over Trump-supporting Republicans, and that this would never happen if Trump is his main opponent.

Democratic support for Musk's third party includes Dean Phillips, who finished in second place amongst the candidates in the 2024 Democratic presidential primaries and was a U.S. representative from Minnesota's 3rd congressional district. He's personally stated an interest in meeting with Musk to discuss his plans for a third party, having recently cited concerns that Democrats further to the left like Zohran Mamdani are a "grave threat" to the party.

Alex Burns, writing for POLITICO, however, remained optimistic that Musk may find success if he makes clear, partisan positions on issues, calling them "targets of opportunity". Burns suggested various policies that Musk could pursue, including: focusing on opposing Trump's tariffs and "championing free trade", promoting fiscal conservatism, and advocating for technocratic interests.

In early July, Musk stated that the America Party could focus on "two or three Senate seats" and "eight to ten House districts" to serve as the "deciding vote on contentious laws" and represent general will. He later suggested that the party would run in the 2026 elections, comparing his strategy to that used by the Greek general Epaminondas in the Battle of Leuctra, a "concentrated force at a precise location on the battlefield". Although Epaminondas won the Battle of Leuctra his success wouldn't last and would be killed at Mantinea. He also stated that the party would caucus separately from both the Democratic and the Republican parties and that "legislative discussions would be had with both parties" afterward.

The possibility of Musk establishing a viable third party is widely perceived as difficult. The Washington Post noted that, although Musk has sufficient wealth to establish a political party, complications in his business career, his inability to influence the 2025 Wisconsin Supreme Court election, and his declining popularity as a result of his work at the Department of Government Efficiency could hinder his efforts.

The America Party would face practical challenges of ballot access, with each state having its own rules on access.

==== Polling ====
A YouGov poll released on July 14 showed that although 45% of Americans thought a viable third party was "necessary", only 11% of Americans would support Musk's party.

A July 15 poll by Echelon Insights asking which party you would vote for, found that while only 4.95% of voters would vote for Musk's party, that this almost exclusively pulled from the Republican party allowing the Democrats to win with a comfortable margin.

A Quinnipiac University poll released on July 16 showed that 77% of Americans would not consider joining the party, with only 17% saying they would.

A CNN poll released on July 17 showed that the vast majority of both adults (74%) and voters in general (77%) oppose Musk's new party, and that only 17% of voters would consider joining the party. CNN compared the results to Perot, noting that unlike Musk more than 50% of Americans supported him forming the Reform Party while only 37% of voters opposed his party.

== Argentina ==
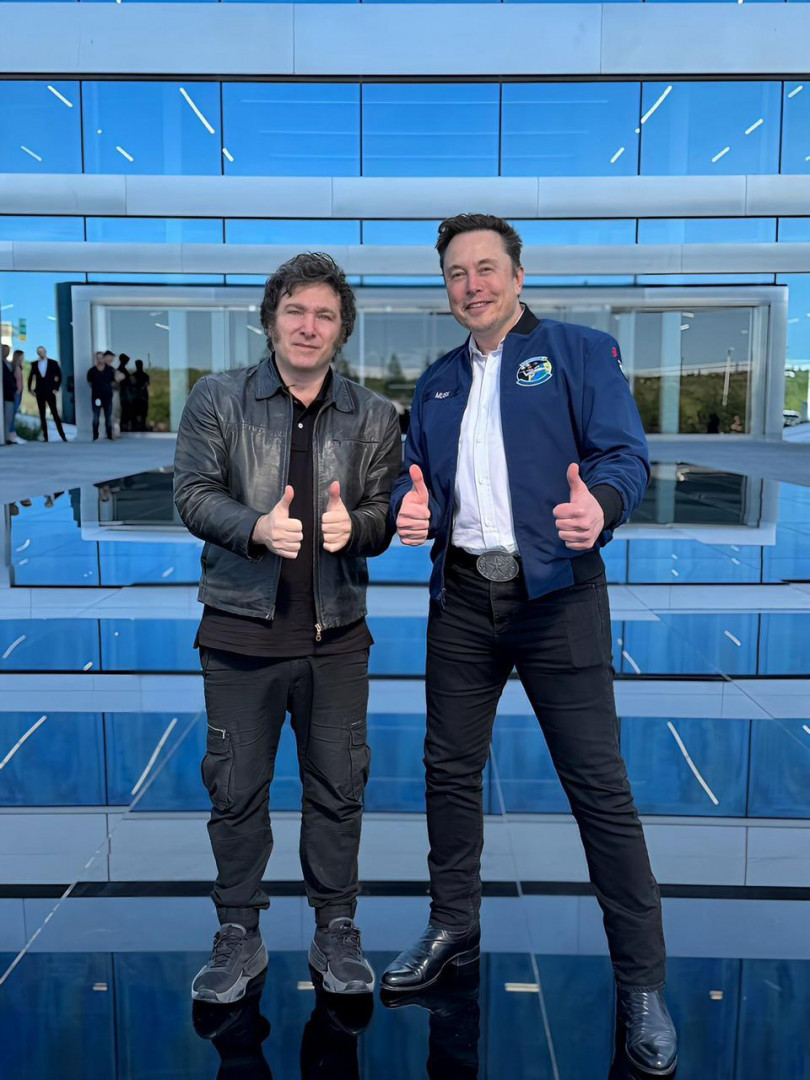
Argentine President Javier Milei (left) and Musk (right) meeting at the Tesla Factory in Austin, Texas, on April 12, 2024

Following the 2023 Argentine general election, Musk congratulated Javier Milei for his victory, writing that "prosperity is ahead for Argentina". Prior to his inauguration, Musk met with Milei; in a televised interview, Milei said that Musk was "extremely interested in lithium". In February 2024, Ente Nacional de Comunicaciones authorized Starlink, among other satellite internet providers, to operate in the country. Milei has sought to encourage lithium investment in Argentina, including a law that would give foreign investors in the mining industry tax cuts and various benefits for thirty years. In April, Milei and Musk met at a Gigafactory in Austin, Texas, in which they agreed to hold a "big event" in Argentina to promote freedom; The Wall Street Journal noted that the meeting followed praise that Musk offered for Milei, including for his speech at the World Economic Forum, as he sought to strengthen relations to gain access to Argentina's lithium resources and the country's approval for Starlink. According to then-ambassador to the United States Gerardo Werthein, Milei and Musk discussed lithium during the meeting. In May, Musk posted, "I recommend investing in Argentina" on X, after meeting with Milei in Los Angeles for an investors conference.

== Canada ==
In January 2025, Musk stepped into Canadian national politics, praising the Conservative Party's Pierre Poilievre and mocking outgoing Prime Minister Justin Trudeau of the Liberal Party. Canadians angry with Musk over his influence in Trump's administration, particularly the attack on Canadian sovereignty, have called for the government to revoke Musk's Canadian citizenship and passport. Musk responded in a tweet that was later deleted that "Canada is not a real country." A petition to the federal government sponsored by MP Charlie Angus ran from February to June 2025 garnered nearly 377,000 signatures from Canadian citizens.

== China and Taiwan ==
Musk's companies, including Tesla and SpaceX, have faced stiff competition in China, where Musk has sought to develop his ventures.

The Taiwanese government began discussing the use of Starlink in the country in 2019, but discussions later faltered after SpaceX representatives pressured government officials to change a majority ownership law requiring telecommunications ventures to be owned by a local business. According to Bloomberg News, Musk sought to own the entire venture. In response to the instability of Starlink in the Russo-Ukrainian War, Taiwan began to develop its own communications network without SpaceX. Then-president Tsai Ing-wen pledged NT$40 billion for an Internet network managed by the Taiwanese government, later partnering with the Luxembourgish network company SES. In November 2023, Chunghwa Telecom announced a partnership with the French satellite operator Eutelsat. In September, Musk compared Taiwan to Hawaii, claiming that the island is an "integral part" of China; Joseph Wu, Taiwan's then-foreign minister, said that Taiwan was "certainly not for sale".

== Germany ==
Musk has prominently endorsed far-right German political party Alternative für Deutschland (AfD), in particular through activities on X. While initial endorsements of party-adjacent social media accounts started as early as late 2023, Musk started actively and openly promoting the party in late 2024 during the prelude of the 2025 German federal elections throughout various activities.

In December 2024, Musk responded to a tweet by German far-right influencer Naomi Seibt with "Only the AfD can save Germany". He reiterated his endorsement shortly after, adding the claim that other political parties have "utterly failed the people". Following the 2024 Magdeburg car attack shortly after his initial endorsement of AfD, Musk called Olaf Scholz, chancellor of Germany at the time, "a "fool" in a tweet on the platform, and called for his resignation. A few days later, on New Year's Day, he also attacked Frank-Walter Steinmeier, calling him an "anti-democratic tyrant".

In January 2025, Musk agreed to host a Space with Alice Weidel, the leader of AfD and expected chancellor candidate of the party at the time, to promote the party and its positions. In it, responding to concerns about AfD being right-wing, Weidel proposed the thesis that Adolf Hitler was actually a communist, and not right-wing. The claim and Musk not contradicting it have been heavily criticized. The stream itself has been observed by European authorities and led to investigations about whether Musk's promotion of the party is a violation of the Digital Services Act regarding X's ranking algorithms unlawfully preferring AfD-adjacent accounts and content.

Previous to his official endorsement, there have been several other incidences of Musk interacting with users on X specifically promoting AfD since at least late 2023, including high-ranking party members. Notably, in April 2024, chair of local AfD Thuringia, Björn Höcke, was facing trial for using slogans historically in use by Nazi Germany's Sturmabteilung, which is punishable by law in Germany. A post by him on X about the situation was commented on by Musk, to which Höcke responded by further defending his use of the slogans. Höcke's original tweet received over 1,000 responses, which observers noted was considerably boosted by Musk's engagement. It was also noted that it was very unusual for Höcke to be tweeting in English instead of German, as well as it being unlikely that Musk would have noticed Höcke's tweets organically. A few weeks after this incident, as a response to a tweet about the European Parliament elections in 2024, Musk voiced doubts about the classification of AfD as a far-right political party, stating the policies he has heard about "don't sound extremist".

In his New Year's Eve address, chancellor Olaf Scholz said that the election will "not be decided by the owners of social media channels". In Der Spiegel, deputy chancellor Robert Habeck accused Musk of mounting a "frontal attack on our democracy". Christiane Hoffmann, a deputy government spokeswoman, accused Musk of attempting to influence the federal election.

Musk's endorsement has also been called into question by other business people, including Bill Gates and German investor Frank Thelen, who previously was a strong supporter of Musk. His involvement in German politics in particular has furthermore led to several German companies as well as other organizations ending their business relationships with him, as well as closing their social media accounts on X.

It has been observed by Bundesdatenschau, a project that analyzes the influence of German political parties on X, that AfD as well as associated accounts by party leaders such as Alice Weidel have considerably gained in reach on the platform since Musk's endorsements in 2025 compared to 2024.

=== 2024 Die Welt op-ed ===
In December 2024, German daily newspaper of record Die Welt published an op-ed authored by Musk, where he reiterated his endorsement of Alternative für Deutschland previously stated on X, arguing that "traditional parties have failed" as well as calling into doubt the classification of AfD as far-right. The op-ed was published along with an op-ed countering his arguments authored by Jan Philipp Burgard, one of the editors-in-chief of the newspaper.

In direct response to the publication, several journalists and Die Welt employees resigned, including Eva Marie Kogel, department head of op-ed at the time. Additionally, several editors previously opposed the publication, being concerned both with considering it paid electoral campaigning for AfD as well as potential brand damage to the newspaper and the core values of its publishing company Axel Springer SE.

The op-ed was widely criticized both by German media as well as internationally. Some German publications called into question whether the untranslated English version of the op-ed was generated by XAI's own AI model Grok. In a response to the criticism and resignations at Die Welt, Burgard and Ulf Poschardt, editor-in-chief at the time of the op-ed's publication, defended the publication as an expression of freedom of speech.

=== Alternative für Deutschland campaign rally appearance ===
External videos
- Frontline PBS coverage of Elon Musk's appearance at the AfD rally

During a campaign rally of Alternative für Deutschland in January 2025, Musk also joined for a short speech through a video call. Therein, he reiterated his previous statements of party support from X and his op-ed in Die Welt, as well as calling into question the European Union's regulatory reach. In addition, Musk criticized Germany's culture of remembrance, stating that there is "too much of a focus on past guilt and we need to move beyond that". Following Musk's speech, Weidel thanked him for his statements, praised the second presidency of Donald Trump that Musk is closely associated with, and ended her statement with "Make Germany Great Again". AfD politician Maximilian Krah remarked of the appearance "we have the richest and most innovative entrepreneur in the world on our side. We have Elon Musk so of course that makes us extremely sexy. And perception is reality. [...] It shows that we are a serious political force."

Musk's statements on remembrance culture have been widely criticized, in particular due to their timing shortly before the 80th anniversary of the liberation of the Auschwitz concentration camp. Olaf Scholz condemned Musk's comments as well as his general push of European far-right parties. Donald Tusk, prime minister of Poland, called Musk's words on remembrance culture "too familiar and ominous". Steffen Seibert, German ambassador to Israel at the time, stated that "Musk doesn't seem to know [Germany] well at all" and that people are not made felt guilty for crimes committed by the Nazis, contrary to his claims.

== Israel ==
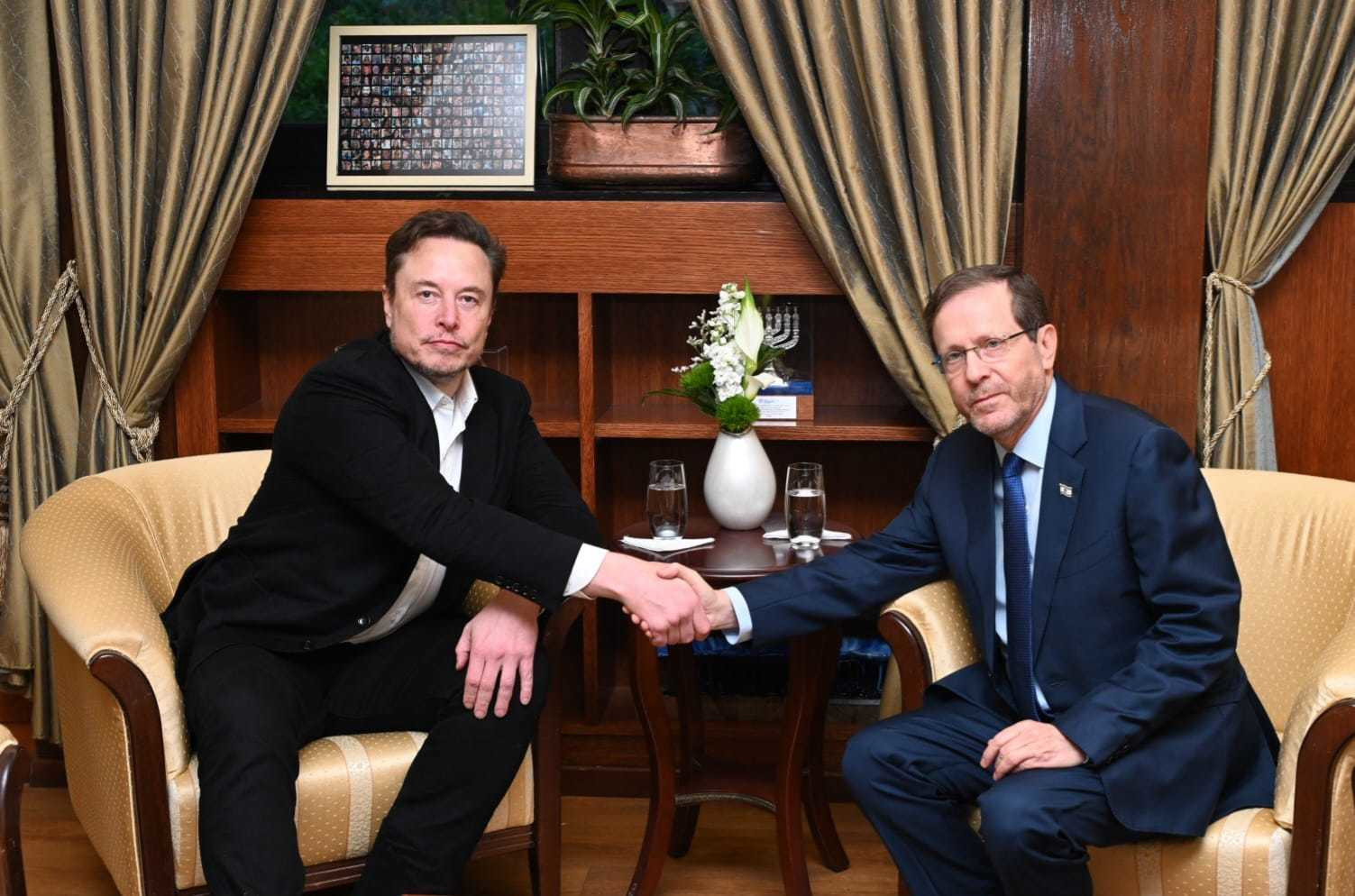
Musk (left) with the president of Israel, Isaac Herzog, November 2023

In September 2023, prime minister Benjamin Netanyahu met with Musk at a Tesla factory in Fremont, California. In November, Musk and Netanyahu toured Kfar Aza, a kibbutz that was attacked by Hamas during the October 7 attacks. Netanyahu invited Musk to attend his address to the United States Congress in July 2024. In December, president Isaac Herzog called Musk to discuss a resolution to the Gaza war hostage crisis.

== Iran ==
In November 2024, The New York Times reported that Musk had met Amir Saeid Iravani in New York to discuss Iran–United States relations. In January 2025, Italian journalist Cecilia Sala was released from an Iranian prison, followed by Iranian engineer Mohammad Abedini Najafabadi, who was detained on behalf of the United States Department of Justice for allegedly producing drone technology used in the Tower 22 drone attack, from an Italian prison. According to The New York Times, Musk contacted Iravani to seek Sala's release. Italian prime minister Giorgia Meloni denied Musk's involvement in her release, citing a "diplomatic triangulation" between U.S., Italy, and Iran.

== Italy ==
In April 2025, Musk joined by video-call a meeting of the populist right-wing Lega party, led by Deputy Prime Minister Matteo Salvini.

== Russia and Ukraine ==
In February 2022, following the Russian invasion of Ukraine, Ukrainian minister Mykhailo Fedorov requested Musk activate Starlink in the country. Additional Starlink terminals arrived two days later. In September, Musk refused to activate a geofence in Crimea, resulting in several boats being damaged. By October, Musk publicly questioned the sustainability of financing Starlink in Ukraine, but said he could continue funding access. That month, Musk posted a poll on Twitter outlining a peace plan that included handing Ukrainian territory over to Russia; in response, Ukrainian president Volodymyr Zelenskyy posted his own poll criticizing him. In February 2023, Musk stated that SpaceX would prohibit Starlink's use in long-range drone strikes. According to Fedorov, Musk provided his private messages to Walter Isaacson for Elon Musk.

In October 2024, The Wall Street Journal reported that Musk had maintained regular contact with Russian president Vladimir Putin for at least two years. In one discussion, Putin asked Musk not to activate Starlink over Taiwan as a favor to Xi Jinping, the general secretary of the Chinese Communist Party. The following month, U.S. senators Jack Reed and Jeanne Shaheen of the Senate Committee on Armed Services sent a letter to U.S. attorney general Merrick Garland and Robert Storch, the inspector general of the Department of Defense, requesting that they reassess Musk's security clearance.

== United Kingdom ==
Musk has been a primary backer of Rupert Lowe's Restore Britain party.

=== Reform UK ===
In December 2024, the leader of the right-wing populist party Reform UK, Nigel Farage, stated that the party was discussing a donation from Musk after they met at Mar-a-Lago with party treasurer Nick Candy. The negotiations were denounced by Conservative Party leader Kemi Badenoch, who stated that the donation would be "counterproductive". In an interview with The Telegraph that month, Farage argued that Musk could court the youth vote for the party and assist in defeating the Conservative Party. In January 2025, Musk expressed support for Tommy Robinson, a far-right anti-Islam activist who was sentenced to over a year in prison on contempt of court charges. In response, several politicians who supported Brexit urged allies of president-elect Donald Trump to not endorse Robinson. Musk subsequently paid for Robinson's legal fees when he was prosecuted for failure to disclose his device security credentials under anti-terrorism law (Robinson was acquitted). Musk later abruptly disparaged Farage as the leader of the Reform Party as not having "what it takes" after Farage disavowed Robinson.

=== 2024 riots ===
On July 29, 2024, a mass stabbing occurred at a dance studio in Southport in which three children were killed and ten other people were injured, later resulting in the violent disorder across the country. After Starmer said "large social media companies and those who run them" were contributing to the disorder, Musk criticised him for not condemning all participants in the riots and only blaming the far-right. Musk also responded to a tweet which said the riots were due to "mass migration and open borders" by tweeting, "Civil war is inevitable". His comments were condemned by Starmer's official spokesman. Musk further said Starmer was responsible for a "two-tier" policing system which did not protect all communities in the United Kingdom, and subsequently shared a conspiracy theory that Starmer's government was planning to build detainment camps in the Falkland Islands to hold far-right rioters. In response, Starmer said: "my focus is on ensuring our communities are safe. That is my sole focus. I think it's very important for us all to support the police in what they're doing".

=== Child sexual abuse scandals ===
In January 2025, Musk began commenting on several child abuse scandals in the UK, including the Rotherham child sexual exploitation scandal, in which young white girls were exploited by predominantly British Pakistani men. Musk said that Jess Phillips, Parliamentary Under-Secretary of State for Safeguarding and Violence Against Women and Girls, "deserves to be in prison", after her denial of requests for a public inquiry into child sexual exploitation in Oldham (Greater Manchester). He claimed that Phillips was a "rape genocide apologist" by rejecting calls for a national investigation. In addition, Musk castigated Keir Starmer, who served as the director of public prosecutions when the abuses were publicized, though he had published guidelines about handling the sexual exploitation of children. During an event for the National Health Service, Starmer indirectly denounced Musk for "lies and misinformation".

Musk has continued to promote anti-immigration sentiment, calling on the British public to support the prominent far-right activist Tommy Robinson. Musk stated:

"When Tolkien wrote about the hobbits, he was referring to the gentlefolk of the English shires, who don't realize the horrors that take place far away. They were able to live their lives in peace and tranquility, but only because they were protected by the hard men of Gondor. What happened to the nice man who was brutally murdered while walking his dog will happen to all of England if the tide of illegal immigration is not turned. It is time for the English to ally with the hard men, like Tommy Robinson, and fight for their survival or they shall surely all perish."

=== Advance UK ===
In June 2025, Musk sent a post in support of the far-right political party, Advance UK, after it was announced by leader Ben Habib. Habib later stated that Musk had urged him to set up a new party in early 2025.

On 26 August 2025, Musk publicly endorsed the party on Twitter, writing: "Advance UK will actually drive change. Farage is weak sauce who will do nothing." This was in response to Reform's plans to deport 600,000 illegal migrants, which some critics saw as too moderate.

== Spain ==
In early 2025, Elon Musk publicly endorsed Spain's far-right party, Vox, predicting its success in the country's upcoming elections, stating "Vox will win the next election." Musk expressed his support through a series of posts on X (formally known as Twitter), where he praised the party's stance on immigration, economic deregulation, and its opposition to European Union policies that he deemed restrictive to technological innovation. His endorsement sparked significant debate in Spain and across Europe, as political analysts viewed it as part of his broader engagement with right-wing movements globally.

Musk's comment led to speculation about potential business interests tied to his endorsement, particularly regarding Spain's lithium mining industry, which is crucial for Tesla, Inc.'s electric vehicle battery production. Some analysts suggested that a Vox-led government might pursue policies more favorable to Musk's business operations in Europe, including regulatory adjustments or tax incentives for tech investments. However, neither Musk nor Vox confirmed any direct discussions about such agreements.

The endorsement also drew criticism from political opponents, who accused Musk of using his vast online influence to interfere in European democratic process. Spanish Prime Minister Pedro Sánchez dismissed Musk's comments as foreign meddling, while European Union officials expressed concerns about the growing role of tech billionaires in shaping political discourse. Despite the controversy, Vox leaders welcomed Musk's support, leveraging it in their campaign to appeal to younger, business-oriented voters.
