= Astra Nova School =

Private online school

Astra Nova School is a nonprofit online school.

Astra Nova is the successor to Ad Astra, originally founded by Elon Musk and Josh Dahn on the campus of SpaceX in Hawthorne, California. Of Ad Astra, The Washington Post said it was possibly "the most exclusive school in the world".

== History ==
Ad Astra (meaning "To the stars" in Latin) was launched in 2014 after Musk pulled his five children out of school, saying in an interview that "They weren't doing the things I thought should be done." Musk hired Josh Dahn to design the new school and teach a small group of students, mainly Musk's own children and those of SpaceX employees, for free. Grades, foreign language studies, and music lessons were notably absent from the school's curriculum. The school left SpaceX campus in June 2020 when Musk's children graduated.

In Walter Isaacson's 2023 biography, Elon Musk, Musk states, "They went there until they were about fourteen but then I thought they should be introduced to the real world for high school. What I should have done is extend Ad Astra through high school."

In August 2020, the former faculty and students of Ad Astra created the non-profit Astra Nova School.

== Curriculum ==
The curriculum focuses on first principles thinking, decision making, and collaboration. According to The New York Times, Musk and Dahn split intellectual property of the school 50-50. Ad Astra and Astra Nova use various open-ended scenarios, called "Conundrums", that encourage constructive disagreement. Conundrums have been used in millions of classrooms in partnership with ClassDojo. Synthesis, a venture-backed educational technology company founded in 2020, is also based on the work of Astra Nova.

== Operations ==
The school is currently run by Josh Dahn and co-founders Dr. Rosemary Rohde and Tara Safronoff. The school says it accepts students ages 11–18, and has an enrollment of 315 students from 45 countries as of June 2026.
