= Gene Hamilton (lawyer) =

American lawyer and policymaker

Gene Patrick Hamilton is an American lawyer and policymaker who served within the U.S. Department of Justice and Department of Homeland Security during the first presidency of Donald Trump. In these positions, he played key roles in ending the Deferred Action for Childhood Arrivals (DACA) program, creating the Trump administration's "zero tolerance" family separation policy, and in revoking the Temporary Protected Status of immigrants from Sudan and South Sudan.

Hamilton currently serves as the Vice President of America First Legal, a legal action group founded by former Trump administration officials, including Stephen Miller. In this role, he has represented the state of Texas in a lawsuit aiming to reinstate Trump-era policies that bar unaccompanied migrant children from entering the United States. He also serves as the treasurer for Citizens for Sanity, a conservative political action committee.

In 2023, Hamilton authored the chapter on the Department of Justice for the ninth edition of the Heritage Foundation's book Mandate for Leadership, which provides the policy agenda for Project 2025.

== Education and early career ==
Hamilton was raised in Arizona. He received a Bachelor's degree from the University of Georgia, and a J.D. from the Washington and Lee School of Law in 2010. While attending law school, Hamilton interned at the Krome Immigration and Customs Enforcement (ICE) detention facility in Miami, Florida; upon graduation he accepted a role as an Honors Attorney at the Department of Homeland Security, eventually returning to ICE in its Office of Chief Counsel in Georgia.

In 2015, Hamilton left the Department to become General Counsel to then-Senator Jeff Sessions, under whom he would later work at the Department of Justice when Sessions became the United States Attorney General. In 2016, Hamilton joined the Trump transition team, ultimately leading its immigration policy efforts.
