= Citizens for Sanity =

Conservative political action committee

Citizens for Sanity (CFS) is a political action committee founded in the United States in June 2022. The group ran ads costing $93 million in the lead-up to the 2022 United States elections in support of conservative culture war causes; more than $50 million of the money came from Elon Musk. The organization is aligned with the policies of Donald Trump and operates out of the headquarters of the Conservative Partnership Institute (CPI) in Washington, D.C., a "nerve center" of the American right-wing.

== Background ==
CFS is led by former Republican senator and Jim DeMint, former president of the Heritage Foundation, with former Donald Trump chief of staff Mark Meadows as a senior advisor. CPI serves as an incubator for Trump loyalists to develop strategies. Citizens for Sanity claims that they are "not an ideological organization" but that they oppose "woke insanity". According to Politico, the group has worked with Republican campaign consultants to run ads in swing districts.

According to reporting by OpenSecrets, the group's board includes three members of the America First Legal, a group founded by Stephen Miller. This includes the group's treasurer, Gene Hamilton, who had previously worked to repeal DACA as part of the Trump administration. OpenSecrets describes Citizens for Sanity as a dark money group. A 2024 Wall Street Journal investigation found that in fall 2022, Elon Musk had donated over $50 million to the group.

== Advertisements ==
The group has run various billboards and television advertisements, largely focusing on transgender individuals and crime. For example, one of their television ads focuses on transgender people in sports, showing a trans woman participating in a track meet and defeating all of her presumably cisgender competitors. Many of the group's billboards sarcastically promote policies the group disagrees with, such as one which reads "Vote to keep our borders, jails and bathrooms open. Vote progressive", and another that reads "Too much freedom is a bad thing. Get your IRS audit today".

The group's television ads were criticized by Philadelphia Inquirer columnist Will Bunch, who said they were "deliberately dishonest", and contended that they were packed with unnecessarily violent and unwanted content that was purposefully placed during NFL and Major League Baseball broadcasts without any regard for young or apolitical audiences. Bunch wrote that the ads by Citizens for Sanity were even more extreme than the notorious Willie Horton commercial from 1988. Los Angeles Times columnist Michael Hiltzik described one of their ads, which focused on illegal immigration, as "unbelievably racist". The ad, which ran during a 2022 playoff game between the San Diego Padres and the Los Angeles Dodgers, characterized immigrants as criminals, and claimed that illegal immigration is "draining your paychecks, wrecking your schools, ruining your hospitals, threatening your family".

== See also ==
- America PAC
- Building America's Future
- RBG PAC
