= Eugene Hamilton (American politician) =

Mississippi politician

Member of the Mississippi House of Representatives from the 6th district
- In office January 5, 2004 – January 2016
- Succeeded by: Dana Criswell

Personal details
- Born: July 4, 1941 (age 85) Olive Branch, Mississippi, United States
- Party: Republican

Eugene Forrest Hamilton (born July 4, 1941) is an American politician. He served as a member of the Mississippi House of Representatives from the 6th District, being first elected in 2003 and losing in a 2016 primary. A pharmacist, he is a member of the Republican party.
