= Eugene Hamilton (physician) =

American medical researcher (1910–2005)

Eugene Green Hamilton (died June 1, 2005, aged 94) was an American OB/GYN obstetrician, academic, and medical researcher. He did some of the key writing in the effort to develop a vaccine which fought against Rh disease.

== Biography ==
Hamilton was born on June 27, 1910, in White Hall, Illinois. In 1944, he married Mary Jo Hickey of Minnesota. He graduated from the University of Illinois at Urbana-Champaign in medicine in 1938, and graduated from the St Louis University with speicalist training in obstetrics and gynecology in 1941. He then served in the Navy Medical Corps from 1942 to 1945. He later worked as an OB/GYN doctor in several different hospitals, including St. Mary's Health Center, where he became head of service in 1962 to 1978 and staff president in 1982. He was also formerly a professor of clinical obstetrics at St Louis University.

Hamilton was known for his research and work on finding a way to prevent Rh disease.

Hamilton died on June 1, 2005, aged 94, of congestive heart failure, leaving three children and five grandchildren.

== Writing ==
- The Rh Factor
- "The Green Journal"
- "Inner Uterus Blood Transfusions" – 1960s

== See also ==
- Rhesus blood group system
- Rh disease
- Rho(D) Immune Globulin
