= America PAC =

Political Action Committee in the United States

- A banner design used to represent America PAC
- Founded: July 2024; 2 years ago
- Founder: Elon Musk
- Registration no.: C00879510
- Legal status: Super PAC
- de facto Leader's: Phil Cox, Generra Peck, and Dave Rexrode
- Revenue: 263,494,648 USD (Jan 2023 to Dec 2024)
- Website: theamericapac.org

The America PAC (AMERICA) is a super PAC (political action committee) created by Elon Musk with the backing of a number of prominent tech businessmen to support Donald Trump's 2024 presidential campaign, and later used to support other GOP candidates and causes. The group's primary purpose is to finance canvassing operations. Musk is the primary donor, with his contributions making up 91% of the declared contributions as of December 2024.

== History ==
America PAC was founded to support Donald Trump's campaign during the 2024 United States presidential election. Backers include Elon Musk, Douglas Leone, Palantir Technologies co-founder Joe Lonsdale, Tyler Winklevoss, Cameron Winklevoss, Ken Howery, Shaun Maguire of Sequoia Capital, and SpaceX board member Antonio Gracias. Musk told friends earlier in 2024 that he sought secrecy about his support for Trump; some of his backers initially "anchored" the PAC so that Musk's investment would be made after July 1 and thus would not be publicly disclosed until shortly before the election.

Musk said in an interview with Jordan Peterson that he has "created a PAC or Super PAC or whatever you want to call it" called "America PAC". Musk was reported to have pledged to contribute $45 million a month to the PAC. However, Musk has subsequently stated that the $45 million per month commitment never took place, and that the press has misreported his intentions. He further clarified that he will be donating to America PAC, but in a much lower albeit unspecified amount. From its inception through September 2024, Musk was the sole donor to the PAC, totaling about $75 million, increasing to more than $118 million in October 2024.

In the end stages of the 2024 election season the Trump campaign outsourced much of the on the ground campaigning in swing states to America PAC. In October, Musk seized the X handle @America to promote the group.

In 2025, America PAC participated prominently in the Wisconsin Supreme Court elections offering $100 to voters who signed a petition against "activist judges". America PAC was the largest source of out of state money in the race. The PAC's spending in the Wisconsin election had topped $18 million by the end of March. In the Wisconsin Supreme Court the PAC has created a petition and giveaway program as well as engaged in door to door canvassing.

In July 2026, it was reported that America PAC planned to spend upwards of $100–120 million on midterm election campaigns. By mid-October, disclosures to the Federal Election Commission revealed that it had spent nearly $500 million on the midterms; the majority of the spending was on the Texas Senate campaign, including attack ads targeting Democratic candidate James Talarico.

== Leadership ==
Following a series of transitions in July 2024, veteran political strategists Phil Cox, Generra Peck, and Dave Rexrode took guiding positions in the organization.

== Efforts ==
The group has been engaged in voter information gathering efforts. These efforts have faced scrutiny from regulators and other groups in those states. The group has set a goal of registering 800,000 new voters in swing states for the 2024 election.

The PAC provided funding to Republican candidates in key house races including Mike Lawler, Ken Calvert, Michelle Steel, Ken Coughlin, Marc Molinaro, Tom Kean Jr., Derrick Merrin, David Valadao, Austin Theriault, and Joe Kent.

=== Social media activities ===
America PAC paid for ads on social media platforms including Facebook, YouTube and X, the latter of which received less investment than the other two. From July to October 2024, the company invested $3 million on Facebook and Instagram advertisements, with $1.5 million being spent on Google and $201,000 on X.

The efforts are targeted at voters in swing states and have included provocative internet ads featuring the attempted assassination of Donald Trump. Ads have been targeted at voters in Arizona, Michigan, Georgia, North Carolina, Nevada, Pennsylvania, and Wisconsin. According to Wired, as of October 2024, the ads had amassed 32 million impressions.

Social media content shared by America PAC have included a video which depicts a fighter with Kamala Harris' face being physically attacked by a sword-wielding Trump. Another post shared by the organization stated that "Harris is a 'C-word'"—an allusion to the word "cunt", a vulgar word used against women—before calling her a "communist".

America PAC administers an "Election Integrity Community" on X, in October 2024 Musk tweeted that his followers should report issues with the 2024 election there.

==== VoteSafe.org ====
For the 2026 midterms, America PAC focused its advertising efforts on "VoteSafe.org", a website backed by the PAC that is meant to compete with the official U.S. government voter advocacy website Vote.gov, and the non-profit group Vote.org. These included non-partisan advocacy advertising, and attack ads targeting Democrat candidates such as Chris Pappas, Mary Peltola, James Talarico, and Josh Turek.

In September 2026, election officials in Colorado and Washington warned voters that America PAC had been advertising inaccurate and "misleading" information meant to drive traffic to VoteSafe.org, in order to harvest voter data and sign voters up for receive text messages; journalist Judd Legum noted that the site's privacy policy allowed the sharing of personally identifying information and "inferences" from VoteSafe.org with third-party business partners (including social networks, and advertising data companies such as The Trade Desk).

VoteSafe.org was also used as a backend by Sentinel Action Fund—a super PAC affiliated with the Heritage Foundation, and Ready to Register—a group in North Carolina that had similarly been flagged by the state's elections board for unsolicited voter registration mailings that contained outdated information.

=== Canvassing ===
The PAC employed canvassers in key battleground states. Blitz Canvassing LLC contracted to work in Arizona, North Carolina, Michigan, and Nevada. It had previously contracted with the September Group in Arizona and Nevada but cancelled those contracts in September 2024. Blitz Canvassing LLC is a subsidiary of GP3 which is owned by the same political strategists who run America PAC, this has led to criticism from some within the Trump campaign. Patriot Grassroots LLC has been hired to do work in Georgia and Pennsylvania. The Synapse Group has been retained to work in Wisconsin. America PAC is the only Trump campaign affiliated group to hire canvassers in all seven battleground states. In Wisconsin, America PAC has also collaborated with Turning Point Action, combining their canvassing efforts. Despite these contracted and combined efforts America PAC struggled to meet their canvassing targets.

The PAC was mailed partially prefilled absentee ballot applications to residents in Georgia during the 2024 presidential election. In February 2026, the Georgia State Election Board issued a letter of reprimand alleging that the PAC's activities had violated state law.

In Michigan, canvassers contracted by America PAC were subjected to poor working conditions; they were transported in a U-Haul van with no rear seating or seatbelts, and threatened to meet unrealistic quotas under threat of being forced to pay for their hotel rooms and transportation home. After these poor working conditions were reported, the canvassers were fired for speaking to the press. On October 30, a class action lawsuit regarding California labor law violations was filed against multiple entities including America PAC.

According to The Guardian, America PAC's internal data classified 20 to 25% of door-knocks in the states of Arizona and Nevada as being potentially fraudulent. Accusations of fraud against the PAC's canvassers have been further backed by nine Republican workers connected to the organization. According to NBC News, a video tutorial of how to spoof door-knocks and send the fake data to America PAC was leaked to the public. Other cases of potential fraud included canvassers submitting data from locations far away from the homes they were expected to have visited.

=== Petition and giveaways ===
Avatar of Elon Musk

Elon Musk
(@elonmusk)
tweeted:

For every person you refer who is a swing state voter, you get $47! Easy money.

October 6, 2024

==== 2024 presidential election ====
In October 2024, the PAC launched a petition effort focused on the First and Second Amendments. They offered $47 per referral of swing state voter. Musk tweeted, "For every person you refer who is a swing state voter, you get $47! Easy money." He later increased the referral amount to $100, also stating that he'd give away $1 million to a swing state petition signer each day until election day. Petition signers must be registered voters and provide contact information, making it "a data mining tool" for the PAC to contact voters.

Law professor Rick Hasen said that a $1 million giveaway limited to registered voters is a "clearly illegal" violation of section 52 of the United States Code, which concerns voting regulations. The Department of Justice subsequently warned the PAC that it might be breaking the law. On the same day that the warning was issued, the PAC did not announce any winner of the giveaway, with Musk offering no explanation as to why. On the day after, the organization resumed its activities and announced two more winners.

On October 28, Larry Krasner, the district attorney for Philadelphia, filed suit against Musk and the PAC, alleging that it is an "illegal lottery scheme" and violated state law. Krasner further stated that the civil lawsuit does not preclude any potential criminal prosecution. Musk attempted to have the case moved to federal court, but a federal judge ruled against him, and returned the case to state court. At a court hearing, Musks's lawyers stated that although Musk had said that the money would be awarded "randomly" and by "chance", the winners weren't chosen at random but instead were evaluated to "feel out their personality, (and) make sure they were someone whose values aligned" with the PAC and were being paid to serve as spokespersons. The winners also had to sign nondisclosure agreements. A judge dismissed Krasner's suit on November 4.

After Musk's lawyers stated that the awards were not random, two giveaway participants, one from Texas and another from Michigan, filed lawsuits against Musk and America PAC in federal courts alleging that they had been misled by the defendants. The plaintiff in the Texas case stated that she would never have signed the petition had she known that the giveaways were not random. The Michigan plaintiff, who supported Kamala Harris for president, said that "the selection not only is not random, but is a targeted process that eliminates anyone who is not a Republican or vocal supporter of Donald Trump".

==== 2025 Wisconsin Supreme Court election ====
In 2025, America PAC conducted a petition/giveaway in Wisconsin asking voters to oppose "activist judges" in support of Wisconsin Supreme Court candidate Brad Schimel. On March 27, the PAC announced that a petition signer had won a million dollars. The spending on the Wisconsin judicial election came as Tesla was suing the state to allow it to open dealerships. The petition and giveaway were challenged by Wisconsin's attorney general but the courts did not take any action against them. On March 30, two more winners were announced and presented with checks for a million dollars at an event hosted by Musk in Green Bay, Wisconsin. At the event Musk described the checks as a media gimmick. One winner said, "I did exactly what Elon Musk told everyone to do: sign a petition, refer friends and family, vote, and now I have a million dollars." she was reported to be an employee of a Green Bay area company whose owner has contributed significantly to the ongoing judicial campaign. The other winner was reported to be the chair of the Wisconsin College Republicans. On April 1, the PAC removed the video of the winners and replaced it with a reshoot which was almost identical except for excluding the word "vote". with the first winner now saying, "I did exactly what Elon Musk told everyone to do: sign the petition, refer friends and family, and now I have a million dollars."

== See also ==
- Save America, the political action committee of Donald Trump
- America Party, a similarly named political party founded by Elon Musk
- Citizens for Sanity, a conservative political action committee
- Views of Elon Musk
- Rockbridge Network
- Building America's Future
- RBG PAC
- Musk Foundation
