= Donald Trump 2024 presidential campaign =

American political campaign

Donald Trump for President 2024
- Campaign: 2024 Republican primaries 2024 U.S. presidential election
- Candidate: Donald Trump; 45th president of the United States (2017–2021); JD Vance; U.S. senator from Ohio (2023–2025)
- Affiliation: Republican Party
- Status: Announcement: November 15, 2022; Nomination as Republican candidate: March 12, 2024; Official nomination: July 15, 2024; Election victory: November 6, 2024; Certification: January 6, 2025; Inauguration: January 20, 2025
- Headquarters: Palm Beach, Florida
- Key people: Chris LaCivita; Susie Wiles; Steven Cheung; Boris Epshteyn; Karoline Leavitt; ...and others
- Receipts: US$448,966,052
- Slogans: Make America Great Again; America First!; Never Surrender!; Make America Healthy Again; Too Big to Rig; Swamp the Vote; Drill, baby, drill; No Tax on Tips; Make America Greater than Ever Before; Trump Will Fix It
- Theme song: "God Bless the U.S.A." by Lee Greenwood "Hold On, I'm Comin'" by Sam & Dave "America First" by Merle Haggard "Y.M.C.A." by Village People
- Chant: "USA!"; "Fight! Fight! Fight!"

Website
- www.donaldjtrump.com (as of November 4, 2024)

Donald Trump, the 45th president of the United States (2017–2021) ran a successful campaign for the 2024 U.S. presidential election. He formally announced his campaign on November 15, 2022, initially battling for the Republican Party's nomination. While many candidates challenged the former president for the nomination, they did not manage to amass enough support, leading Trump to a landslide victory in the 2024 Iowa caucuses. On March 12, 2024, he became the Republican Party's presumptive nominee. Trump was officially nominated on July 15 at the Republican National Convention, where he chose JD Vance, the junior U.S. senator from Ohio, as his vice presidential running mate. On November 5, Trump and Vance were elected president and vice president of the United States, winning all seven swing states (Note: The swing states in 2024 were Wisconsin, Michigan, Pennsylvania, North Carolina, Georgia, Arizona, and Nevada.) as well as the popular vote with a plurality.

Trump's agenda was branded as populist and nationalist. It pledged sweeping tax cuts, a protectionist trade policy, greater federal oversight over education, (Note: However, Trump simultaneously promised to shut down the United States Department of Education.) more extensive use of fossil fuels, an "America First" foreign policy, an expansion of presidential authority, a reduction of federal regulations, mass deportation of illegal immigrants, (Note: While Trump's proposed deportation program primarily targeted illegal immigrants, he also pledged to displace legal immigrants.) stricter law enforcement, an end to diversity, equity, and inclusion programs, and a rollback of transgender rights. While the campaign's official platform was Agenda 47, it was considered closely connected to The Heritage Foundation's Project 2025, a playbook recommending an authoritarian, rigidly conservative state.

Trump's rhetoric, regarded as inflammatory and extreme and featuring disinformation and fearmongering, drew immense media coverage. He sought to establish himself as a political martyr being targeted by the political and media establishment, and that his campaign was one of vindication and a battle between good and evil.

On the campaign trail, Trump faced numerous legal troubles, culminating in four indictments and a felony conviction. Court cases also arose concerning his eligibility to run in the aftermath of the January 6, 2021 Capitol attack, which were eventually resolved. Trump also survived a minor injury in an assassination attempt. Many commentators state that these setbacks helped his public image.

The campaign's success was attributed to an effective media strategy, a distinct appeal to younger, male, and minority voters, and a strong focus on the public's political and economic concerns.

== Origins ==
=== Background ===
Donald Trump's 2024 presidential campaign is his fourth, following a brief one in 2000 for the Reform Party's nomination, and two as the Republican Party's candidate, in 2016 and, subsequently, 2020.

As president, Trump lost the 2020 presidential election to Democratic nominee Joe Biden. He and his allies in seven key states denied the results. They allegedly went on to devise a plot to create and submit fraudulent certificates of ascertainment falsely asserting that Trump had won the electoral college vote in those states. In the event that the plot failed to "work out," Trump would plan another presidential run in 2024. On January 6, 2021, a mob of Trump supporters stormed the Capitol to prevent the true election results from being certified. The former President was thereafter impeached for incitement of insurrection, but was acquitted.

The Biden administration succeeding Trump's oversaw the end of the COVID-19 pandemic, a spike in inflation lasting from 2021 to 2023, a surge in crossings at the border with Mexico, and the outbreak of two major wars in Ukraine and in Gaza. While the President began his term with an approval rating well above 50%, it had dropped to just 43% by September 2021, according to Gallup, following the "chaotic" U.S. withdrawal from Afghanistan and a gradual rise in inflation from 1.7% in February to 5.4%. His popularity never recovered, and by June 2022, inflation had risen to 9.1%, a 40-year high. Besides worsening inflation, Biden was met by a strong public perception that the border was uncontrolled. When Russia invaded Ukraine in February 2022, Biden aided Ukraine, and allocated $182 billion in emergency funding. When the Gaza war broke out in November 2023, the President strongly supported Israel. These three issues: global uncertainty, inflation, and the migrant crisis, would be the focal points of the future Trump campaign.

By July 2022, amid the public hearings of the House Select Committee on the January 6 Attack, Trump was reportedly considering making an early announcement of his 2024 candidacy. A contemporary Intelligencer interview with Trump affirmed that he had already made up his mind. Following the August 2022 FBI search of Mar-a-Lago, many of his allies urged that he initiate his campaign even sooner, perhaps prior to that year's midterm elections.

=== Announcement ===
Donald Trump announced his candidacy for president on November 15, 2022, in an hour-long address from Mar-a-Lago. It came one week after the midterm elections. The campaign would be based in Mar-a-Lago, in West Palm Beach, Florida. Reporting for Axios, Zachary Basu noted that at the time of the announcement, Trump was the "underdog" and "at the weakest moment of his political career". His candidacy was met with a mixed response from both Democrats and Republicans. He was perceived by many as a weak, beatable candidate, owing to his loss in 2020 and the failure of an expected Republican "red wave" in the 2022 midterms to materialize. (Note: In fact, the Republican candidates Trump endorsed for the 2022 midterms generally underperformed those that he did not.) This led several Republican officials to oppose his campaign, and several Democrats to welcome it. The conservative New York Post mocked Trump's announcement by relegating it to page 26 and noting it on the cover with a banner reading "Florida Man Makes Announcement". On the other hand, Trump-aligned Republicans embraced the campaign, and many Democrats deemed it a threat to American democracy.

Trump was the first one-term president to campaign for a second non-consecutive term since Herbert Hoover (1929–1933), who, after losing in 1932, made unsuccessful runs in 1936 and 1940.

=== Fundraising ===
At its inception, Trump's campaign had over $100 million in funding. Its primary vehicle for fundraising was Save America, a leadership political action committee (PAC), joined by the MAGA PAC and Super PAC. However, his legal expenses from his court cases would absorb much of that funding. In fact, from January 2021 to March 2024, he spent more than $100 million in legal fees from campaign accounts. In 2023, the year of Trump's four criminal indictments, over half of his financial donations were allocated to paying off legal bills.

While running against Joe Biden, Trump overwhelmingly lagged behind his opponent in fundraising. His legal expenses combined with Biden's plentiful financial hauls laid at the heart of this problem. At the start of March 2024, Trump's campaign and Trump-aligned Super PACs had half as much cash on hand as Biden's campaign and Biden-aligned Super PACs. However, Trump's fundraising eventually took a turn for the better, with the former President raising more money than his opponent in April, and beating Biden's total fundraising for the first time. Things again turned sour for Trump's campaign after Biden withdrew from the race. The new Democratic nominee, Kamala Harris, brought in $200 million during the first week of her presidential campaign. In July, Trump's campaign and assorted committees reporting taking in $138.7 million compared to Harris and Democratic committees' $310 million. All in all, throughout their campaigns (specifically, since January 2023), the Trump committee raised $388 million, while that Biden–Harris raised nearly $1 billion.

According to OpenSecrets, Trump's greatest donors were hedge fund manager Ken Griffin (who donated $100 million), pro-Israel activist Miriam Adelson ($132 million), railroad magnate Timothy Mellon ($197 million), and, most notably, businessman Elon Musk ($277 million (Note: While estimates of Musk's campaign donations widely vary, all major sources put them above $250 million.)). Musk was not only the largest individual political donor of the 2024 election, but also the largest individual political donor since at least 2010, excluding candidates funding their own campaigns. He also launched a $1 million a day giveaway for swing state voters. OpenSecrets additionally found that the top seven donors of the 2024 campaign were "solidly Republican/Conservative".

Trump notably mixed his personal business with political fundraising. He promoted $59.99 "God Bless the U.S.A." Bibles, $399 sneakers, $99 "Victory47" cologne, and $99 Trump-branded NFT digital trading cards for his personal, non-campaign accounts. Many campaign funds were also funneled into Trump-owned businesses, in particular his Mar-a-Lago resort and the Trump National Doral Miami.

=== Eligibility ===
Republican primary ballot eligibility prior to Trump v. Anderson, the U.S. Supreme Court that established Trump's eligibility Case dismissed by state supreme court Case dismissed by lower court Decision ruled that Trump is ineligible; stayed, pending appeal Lawsuit filed

Trump's eligibility to run for president was challenged. The Fourteenth Amendment to the Constitution, Section 3, prohibits current and former federal, state and military officials who have "engaged in insurrection or rebellion" from holding office again, which was pertinent in Trump's case considering his role in inciting the January 6 attack on the Capitol. By 2023, the non-profit group Citizens for Responsibility and Ethics in Washington and other advocacy groups and individuals were planning state-by-state efforts to keep Trump off state ballots. Court cases sprung up in multiple states.

In December 2023, the Colorado Supreme Court ruled that, under the Fourteenth Amendment, Trump was ineligible from holding office and that his name must be removed from the Colorado Republican primary ballot. This decision was the first of its kind in American history. Later that month, Maine's Secretary of State followed suit and banned Trump from Maine's Republican primary ballot. In March 2024, following an appeal from Trump's campaign, the U.S. Supreme Court unanimously overturned Colorado's Supreme Court ruling, saying that states do not have the authority to disqualify Trump or other candidates from federal elections under the Fourteenth Amendment's insurrection clause.

== Agenda and strategy ==
=== Agenda ===
Donald Trump's formal campaign manifesto was Agenda 47. It took the form of a series of videos on his official website outlining his proposals one by one. Seeing that the series was cut short in December 2023, Agenda 47 was primarily targeted to Republican voters during the 2024 primary season. His website's homepage contained a list of 20 campaign proposals.

President Trump's 20 CORE PROMISES TO MAKE AMERICA GREAT AGAIN!
- Seal the border and stop the migrant invasion
- Carry out the largest deportation operation in American history
- End inflation, and make America affordable again
- Make America the dominant energy producer in the world, by far
- Stop outsourcing, and turn the United States into a manufacturing superpower
- Large tax cuts for workers, and no tax on tips
- Defend our Constitution, our Bill of Rights, and our fundamental freedoms, including freedom of speech, freedom of religion, and the right to keep and bear arms
- Prevent World War Three, restore peace in Europe and in the Middle East, and build a great iron dome missile defense shield over our entire country—all made in America
- End the weaponization of government against the American people
- Stop the migrant crime epidemic, demolish the foreign drug cartels, crush gang violence, and lock up violent offenders
- Rebuild our cities, including Washington, D.C., making them safe, clean, and beautiful again
- Strengthen and modernize our military, making it, without question, the strongest and most powerful in the world
- Keep the U.S. dollar as the world's reserve currency
- Fight for and protect Social Security and Medicare with no cuts, including no changes to the retirement age
- Cancel the electric vehicle mandate and cut costly and burdensome regulations
- Cut federal funding for any school pushing critical race theory, radical gender ideology, and other inappropriate racial, sexual, or political content on our children
- Keep men out of women's sports
- Deport pro-Hamas radicals and make our college campuses safe and patriotic again
- Secure our elections, including same day voting, voter identification, paper ballots, and proof of citizenship
- Unite our country by bringing it to new and record levels of success

According to Philip Bump of The Washington Post, Agenda 47 was rarely discussed by Trump as well as the media. He, and others, noted that it was overshadowed by another presidential transition plan closely tied to—in fact, designed for—the Trump campaign, The Heritage Foundation's Project 2025. It planned for massive overhauls to American government, steering it in an uncompromisingly conservative path and relegating much authority to the executive branch. As such, Project 2025 was condemned for unconstitutionally encouraging authoritarianism and moving to turn Trump into a dictator. Trump's campaign officials repeatedly distanced themselves from the plan, stressing that all outside efforts influencing a future presidential transition were "unofficial". Trump himself denied knowing of Project 2025. He went as far as to call some of its proposals "absolutely ridiculous" and "seriously extreme".

Besides The Heritage Foundation, other think-tanks and policy groups aligned with Trump included the Center for Renewing America, the America First Policy Institute, and America First Legal. Trump's preeminent public policy advisers were Steve Bannon, David Bernhardt, Kellyanne Conway, Richard Grenell, Tom Homan, Sean Hannity, Kevin Hassett, Brandon Judd, Keith Kellogg, Larry Kudlow, Robert Lighthizer, Stephen Miller, Stephen Moore, John Ratcliffe, Russell Vought, and Matt Whitaker, though none of them were formally part of the campaign itself. Vince Haley was officially responsible for overseeing the team developing the campaign's policy proposals.

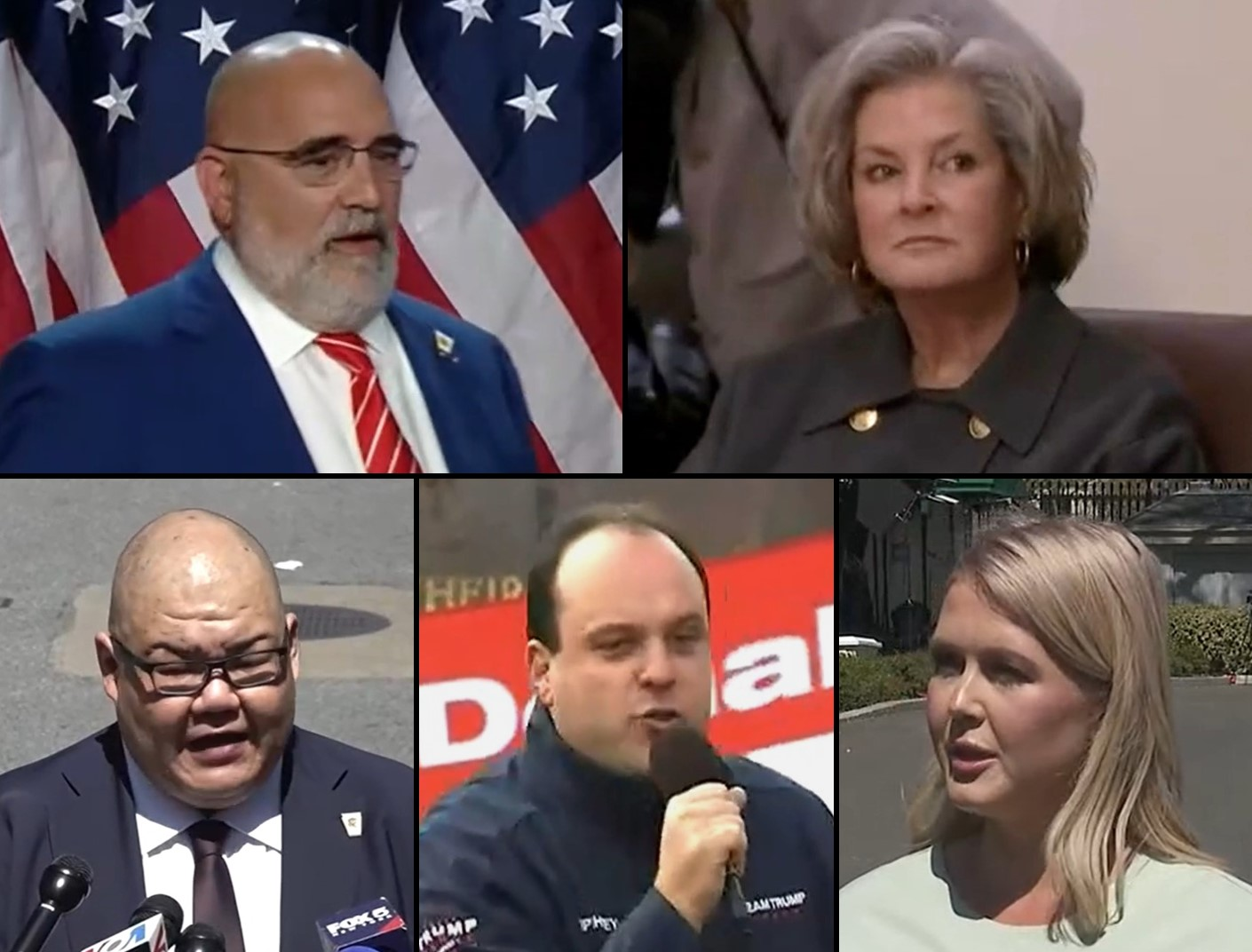
The main officials of Trump's campaign staff: Chris LaCivita, Susie Wiles, Steven Cheung, Boris Epshteyn, and Karoline Leavitt (left to right, top row first)

Key officials in Trump's campaign team
- Chris LaCivita, co-campaign manager
- Susie Wiles, co-campaign manager
- Steven Cheung, communications director
- Boris Epshteyn, in-house counsel
- Karoline Leavitt, national press secretary
- Eric Branstad, senior adviser
- Alex Bruesewitz, senior adviser
- Taylor Budowich, senior adviser
- Alex Latcham, senior adviser
- Corey Lewandowski, senior adviser
- Jason Miller, senior adviser, focusing on communications strategy
- Tim Murtaugh, senior adviser
- Alex Pfeiffer, senior adviser
- Brian Jack, senior aide, focusing on amassing endorsements from lawmakers
- Dan Scavino, senior aide

=== Strategy ===
==== Political ====
Trump attempted to build a broad demographic coalition consisting of Latinos, Arab Americans, Black men, and young men—all groups that traditionally leaned Democratic. He spoke sharply against the economy under Biden's presidency, which resonated with all groups, and stoked culture war issues, appealing to Black and Latino men, who tend toward social conservatism. According to Patrick Ruffini, the former President stood to capitalize off of a gradual political phenomenon: that "the ties that once bound low-income and nonwhite voters to the Democratic Party ... were breaking". Trump also visited cities with concentrated Arab American populations. His efforts were bolstered by the Biden administration's pro-Israel stance on the Gaza war, and Kamala Harris' neglect of these cities throughout the campaign. To drive up turnout, Trump's campaign ran an unconventional ground game. He targeted irregular voters through community building, rather than traditional methods: door knocks, big party machinery, and paid media. Organizations such as Libre and Turning Point USA, besides driving forward an ideological agenda, assembled low propensity voters who felt alienated by the government and cultivated in them a sense of belonging to Trump's cause. As activist Tony Gavito explained, "Mobilizing people to turn out and cast a ballot is not nearly as powerful as organizing people to adopt an identity, commit to a cause, and join a collective effort to push for change".

Regarding rhetoric, Trump deployed fiery, partisan language that, according to commentators, alienated the general public. He rejected the traditional pivot to the center and relied on negative messaging. Even in the campaign's final weeks, he continued homing in on his base and steadfast conservatives, while his opponent, Harris, tried appealing to moderates. This was done to "maximize turnout" from Trump's base. Beyond his base, it served to persuade remaining undecided voters; with extreme rhetoric, they would have a "compelling reason to vote". Trump's extreme statements also played into his populist strategy of airing the public's grievances against the political status quo—that he was saying what no other politician dared to say.

The campaign team utilized Stanley George to lead outreach efforts targeting the Indian-American community, particularly focusing on immigration policies favoring Indian professionals and students.

==== Marketing ====
Writing for Tilted Chair, Kara Villarreal asserts that "Trump didn’t just run a political campaign; he launched a full-scale marketing movement". The former President's messaging was simple, straightforward, and emotional, which analysts found engaged well with his "consumers"—voters. He appealed to their discontent over the economy, immigration, and national pride. One of the means he used to achieve this was mantras he would repeat during rallies, such as, "Are you better off now or four years ago?”, and, "I will fix it." Trump also relied on identity politics by creating an "us versus them" narrative. This, according to analysts, united his supporters and kept them motivated.

On advertising, Trump's campaign faced a massive financial disadvantage. He, like Harris, concentrated ad funding on the seven swing states. However, unlike his opponent, his funding was more localized, focusing more on individual voters than geographical groups. Trump's campaign spent more on YouTube, Twitch, Twitter, and streaming services, while Harris, on Google, Facebook, Instagram, and Snapchat. According to analysts, these two tactics made Trump's advertising strategy more adapted to modern trends, efficient, and ultimately, effective. They also enabled him to overcome his funding limitations. Trump targeted specific swing voters, or "streaming persuadables," while his opponent simply spent on the states at large. He did so by running highly customized ads exclusively in their households. As Trump Super PAC operative David Lee explained, "In the seven states, we were talking to 6.3 million people—they [Harris' campaign] were talking to 44.7 million"; thus, Harris was "wasting 85 percent of [her] money". In addition, the campaign's focus on streaming platforms over television networks catered to undecided voters, half of whom used only streaming and podcasts, not cable.

==== Media ====
Trump's media strategy heavily relied on podcasts and online streaming. It largely, but not entirely, cast traditional forms aside, such as interviews on mainstream media outlets and even a 60 Minutes appearance. Rather, the former President would interact with podcasters and YouTube content creators: Theo Von, Patrick Bet-David, Logan Paul, et cetera, many of whom belonged to the manosphere. He would focus on apolitical matters: sports, family, extraterrestrial life, more than politics. This strategy suited changing media trends, as more and more Americans were resorting to alternative sources for news over mainstream media, as well as being adapted to Trump's "circuitous and colloquial way of speaking". Young people—especially men—were particularly dependent on social media and podcasts for political coverage. On the other hand, Harris concentrated on traditional outlets. The former President garnered further media attention by visiting nonpolitical venues, such as football games and McDonald's.

By establishing a considerable presence on social media, Trump could home in on his tactic of dominating the news. His message was thus spread among more voters. According to Campaigns & Elections, right-wing influencers posted about 2.5 times as much as left-wing influencers throughout the election. Trump's media strategy also bolstered his image. By appearing on podcasts and YouTube videos, which are informal, homely, and unrestrained by design, he came across as approachable. They "humanize[d]" him. Jason Miller, remarked that Trump's media strategy, above all else, relied on "unscripted moments," which earned him more coverage and familiarity. Another benefit of non-traditional media outlets was that Trump could avoid fact-checks. For instance, in his interview with Joe Rogan, he promoted falsehoods about the 2020 election being stolen and exaggerations of his poll numbers. Michael M. Grynbaum and John Koblin of The New York Times noted that the "influencers he met with rarely challenged [him], and often lavished him with praise". Many of the most popular podcasts, including those that Trump had appeared on, would increasingly post political content with conservative messages in the lead up to the election.

==== Artificial intelligence ====
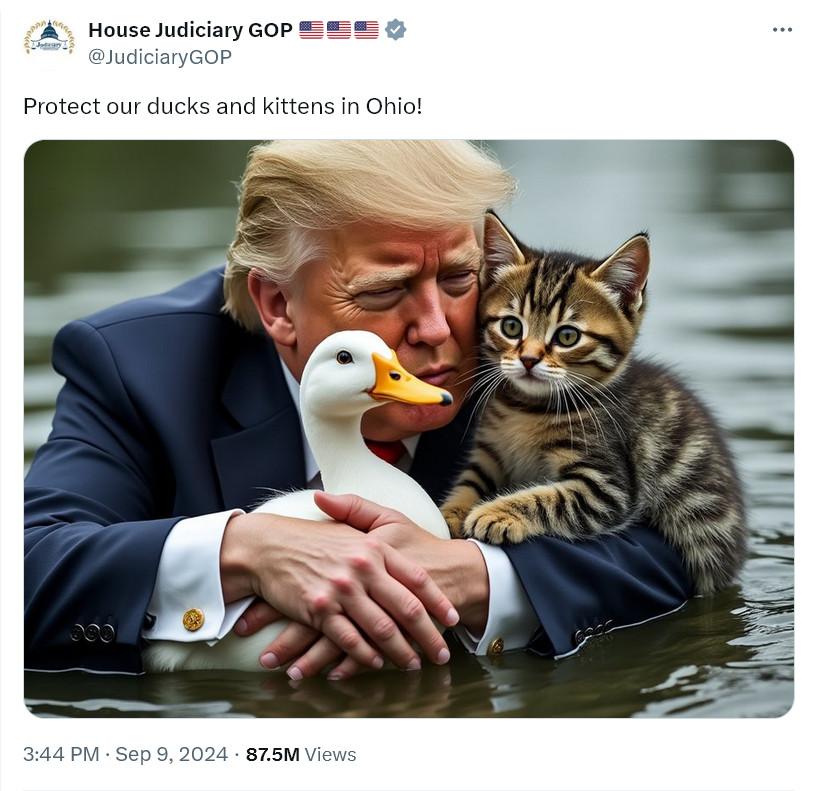
A Trump-aligned committee sharing a deepfake of the candidate embracing a cat and duck, adding credibility to his Springfield pet-eating hoax

Trump and his allies extensively used artificial intelligence. In June 2024, Trump remarked that AI was "really powerful stuff," suggesting that he would deliver a speech written entirely by AI: "[My staffer] goes click click click, and like 15 seconds later he shows me my speech, written so beautifully, I said, 'I'm gonna use this sucker'". As with the Harris campaign, Trump's team shared many deepfakes on social media. These, for instance, presented him astride a lion, or otherwise depicted his opponents unfavorably, such as one of Harris addressing a Soviet-style rally. Such fake images became a vehicle of disinformation, although some commentators note that they were not intended to be believed. Writing for The Guardian, Sophia Smith Galer argues that his campaign deployed deepfakes as "algo-fodder" to sustain his narratives on social media. Trump's campaign also used AI software to enhance efficiency. This included automating repetitive tasks and creating targeted advertisements. One such software, Campaign Nucleus, received more than $2.2 million in funding from his associates.

== Political positions ==
=== Abortion ===
Trump struck a middle ground and often vacillated on abortion. This was done in an attempt to put the issue to rest, having greatly cost Republicans in the 2022 midterms in the wake of Roe v. Wade being overruled that June. He generally called for abortion's legal status to be left up to the individual states. Trump initially did not state whether or not he supported a national 15-week abortion ban, then leaned in favor of it, and then pledged to veto any federal abortion ban. When asked on how he would vote on Florida's abortion referendum, he equivocated. Trump labelled Florida governor Ron DeSantis' six-week abortion ban as "terrible", and criticized Arizona's near total ban on abortion. On the other hand, he stated that he would allow Republican-controlled states to monitor women's pregnancies. Contemporary commentators remarked that Trump's stance on abortion pleased neither progressives nor conservatives, although it was later regarded to have been effective in subduing the issue. In spite of his equivocation throughout the campaign, Trump had previously called himself "the most pro-life president ever", and took credit for overturning of Roe v. Wade, the Supreme Court decision that legalized abortion nationwide. (Note: In fact, all three Supreme Court justices Trump appointed: Neil Gorsuch, Brett Kavanaugh, and Amy Coney Barrett, voted to reverse Roe v. Wade.) In April 2024, he reiterated that he was "proudly responsible" for reversing Roe v. Wade.

=== Economy and trade ===
With your support, we will cut your taxes, end inflation, slash your prices, raise your wages, and bring thousands of factories back to America and back to North Carolina. They're coming back. We will build American, we will buy American, and we will hire American again.

— Donald Trump in an October 2024 rally at Greensboro, North Carolina

Trump's economic agenda featured protective tariffs, lower taxation, and reduced regulations. He sought an economic nationalist system, with the income tax largely, if not completely, replaced by tariffs to defend local manufacturing. Protectionism had been a priority in his first presidency. In 2024, he vowed to enact even higher tariffs, including a 10% to 20% universal baseline tariff, 60% on China, between 25% and 100% on Mexico, and 100% on all cars made outside the U.S. Analysts noted that the proposed tariffs were especially targeted against China, seeing that, among other things, he proposed a four-year plan to phase out Chinese imports of essential goods. Overall, Trump's protectionist program intended to transform the U.S. into a self-sufficient economy. Nonetheless, many economists, including 23 Nobel Prize recipients, warned that it would "lead to higher prices, larger deficits, and greater inequality", as well as a trade war.

One of Trump's key pledges was extending and expanding his 2017 tax cuts. These would further slash all individual and corporate tax rates, which he argued would stimulate America's energy industry and reduce inflation. Companies that made their products in the U.S. would see a reduced corporate rate from 21% to 15%. Furthermore, he intended to cut back on regulations he believed stifle job creation. A 50% reduction in energy prices was also in order. By October 2024, Reuters reported that Trump was "rolling out a new tax-cut proposal about once a week in an unusual rush in the final stretch of the campaign to sway voters". These included making car loan interest fully tax deductible. The former President notably suggested an end to income tax on Social Security benefits, and "No [federal] Tax On Tips".

In light of the post-COVID inflation surge, Trump campaigned on ending the "inflation nightmare". However, as was the case with Harris' economic proposals, economists criticized his plan for potentially leading to an increase in inflation, along with adding around $15 trillion to the national debt. Trump also planned to devalue the U.S. dollar to cheapen American exports.

On April 26, 2024, The Wall Street Journal reported Trump allies plan on greatly limiting the independence of the Federal Reserve should Trump win the election. Of particular note were plans to allow the president to directly set interest rates, remove Chair Jerome Powell before his term expires in 2026, and subject the Fed to oversight from the OMB. Trump stated in a press conference in August 2024 at Mar-a-Lago that he "[feels] the president should have at least [a] say in there" with respect to Federal Reserve interest rate decisions. In June 2024, 16 Nobel Prize in Economics laureates signed an open letter arguing that Trump's fiscal and trade policies coupled with efforts to limit the Federal Reserve's independence would reignite an inflation surge in the United States.

=== Education ===
Trump campaigned on expanding federal management of education, although with exceptions. On the one hand, he pledged to terminate the Department of Education. On the other, he suggested giving funding preference to certain schools and universities. Schools with a mask or vaccine mandate, for instance, would not be federally funded. Education programs that, in Trump's words, include "critical race theory, gender ideology, or other inappropriate racial, sexual, or political content" would receive reduced funding. Such proposals formed part of the former President's plan to fight for "patriotic education." This, according to him, "teach[es] students to love their country, not to hate their country like they're taught right now," "defend[s] American tradition and Western civilization" and promotes "the nuclear family". Furthermore, Trump's campaign advocated universal school choice, arguing that parents should be empowered to choose the best education option for their children. In late 2023, Trump proposed an "American Academy," a free online university open to all Americans that would counter private institutions that "[turn] our students into Communists and terrorists". This would be funded through a tax on the endowments of private universities.

=== Energy and environment ===
Trump's energy proposals heavily favored fossil fuel production and consumption, with little, if any, regard for environmentalism. He encapsulated them under the mantra "drill, baby, drill", or "drill, drill, drill". Overall, Trump aimed to transform the U.S. into an energy independent country with the lowest electricity and energy costs of any country in the world. This aim was well-suited to deal with the spike in gasoline prices caused by war in Ukraine. He promised to increase oil drilling on public lands and offer tax breaks to fossil fuel producers. Furthermore, Trump planned to slash environmental regulations and initiatives. He would rollback all electric vehicle initiatives, halt all wind energy projects, and eliminate regulations targeting incandescent lightbulbs, gas stoves, dishwashers, and shower heads. Regarding global climate efforts, Trump proposed leaving the Paris Agreement, and drafted orders to withdraw from the United Nations Framework Convention on Climate Change. Trump's disproportionate preference of fossil fuels is influenced by his denial of global warming. In a 2022 Fox News interview, Trump labelled it as a "hoax," adding that the climate naturally fluctuated. He did not officially state how he would tackle global warming if elected.

=== Foreign policy ===
It's time to put America first, isn't it? I will end the war in Ukraine. It would have never started if I were president. It would have never—zero chance. I said, "Vladimir, don't even think about it." Zero chance. I will stop the chaos in the Middle East. That would have never happened, October 7th. … But I will prevent World War III. I know them all. We're very close to a world war right now with these people that we have, these low-IQ people that we have right now.

— Donald Trump in a November 2024 rally at Lititz, Pennsylvania

Trump's proposed foreign policy was isolationist (a label he denied), which he branded as "America First". In September 2024, Trump said that America's allies "treat us actually worse than our so-called enemies". Trump promised to "fundamentally reevaluate" NATO's purpose and mission. Trump had said that defending an ally would depend on whether they "fulfilled their obligations to us", called the European Union a "foe" because of "what they do to us in trade", and questioned the value of alliances. In January 2024, Trump said that "NATO has taken advantage of our country" and he would only support allies "if they treat us properly", and if they met the alliance's target of spending 2% of GDP on defense.

On the Russo-Ukrainian War, Trump vowed that even before he is inaugurated, he would negotiate an end to the war in a day, stop the "endless flow of American treasure to Ukraine," and make Europeans reimburse the U.S. the cost of rebuilding its old stockpiles. Trump previously said he might recognize Russia's illegal annexation of Crimea, and suggested the 2022 invasion could have been prevented by Ukraine giving up parts of its own country to Russia. Retired Lieutenant General Keith Kellogg and Frederick H. Fleitz, who both served in Trump's National Security Council staff, presented Trump with a detailed peace plan to end Russia's war in Ukraine. The plan aims to force the two sides into peace talks and a ceasefire based on the current frontlines. If Ukraine refused to enter peace talks, weapons supplies would be stopped; if Russia refused peace talks, weapons supplies to Ukraine would be increased.

Trump brought in more pro-Israel policies than any president before. He presented himself as a stronger defender of Israel, and was seen as less sympathetic to Palestine than Biden or Harris. He vowed to continue supporting Israel in the Gaza war, and said that Israel must "finish the problem". Trump was expected to continue arming Israel, likely with "no strings attached" for humanitarian concerns. He promised to ban Gaza residents from entering the US.

Trump suggested sending armed forces into Mexico to battle drug cartels.

=== Government ===
Trump's platform called for the vast expansion of presidential powers and the executive branch. In campaign speeches, Trump stated that he would centralize government power under his authority, replace career federal civil service employees with political loyalists, and use the military for domestic law enforcement and the deportation of immigrants.

Trump called to bring independent agencies such as the Federal Communications Commission and Federal Trade Commission under direct presidential control. Trump's allies drafted an executive order requiring all independent agencies to submit actions to the White House for review. Trump called for presidential authority to 'impound' funds for Congressionally appropriated programs, a practice which was outlawed under President Richard Nixon. Trump promised to order the U.S. Justice Department to investigate political rivals and Joe Biden, and fire Attorneys General who disobeyed him. He called for jailing people whose actions he objects to, including Supreme Court critics, flag burners, and the January 6 Committee. According to The New York Times, Trump called for stripping employment protections for thousands of career civil service employees and replacing them with political loyalists if deemed an 'obstacle to his agenda' within federal agencies, the U.S. Intelligence Community, State Department, and Department of Defense. Trump proposed instituting a new civil service test of his own creation to test the loyalty of federal workers, and promised to crack down on whistleblowers who are shielded by law and create an independent body to "monitor" intelligence agencies.

Trump's plan to expand presidential powers was based largely on a controversial and not widely-held interpretation of the constitution known as the unitary executive theory. The theory rejects the notion of the separation of powers and that the government is composed of three separate branches but that Article Two of the Constitution gives the President absolute authority. Such proposals would be carried out via the reintroduction of Schedule F that was originally introduced at the end of Trump's former presidency, which would strip civil service protections of tens of thousands of civil servants to be at-will appointments filled with Trump loyalists identified by Project 2025 of The Heritage Foundation. The reforms have been described as a reimposition of the Jacksonian spoils system. His proposal was widely criticized as dangerous for democracy.

Trump pledged to appoint Elon Musk to chair a Federal Efficiency Commission. Trump said the commission would audit the entire federal government and propose "dramatic reforms". Musk also officially announced that he would accept the appointment if Trump was elected. Trump vowed to achieve his long-held goal of drastic reform by minimizing government and cutting red tape government regulations, which he says are the bureaucracies that are holding back American prosperity. He suggested shutting down multiple departments for "bureaucratic waste".

=== Healthcare and welfare programs ===
Trump's key message on healthcare was a call to "Make America Healthy Again," a slogan borrowed from Robert F. Kennedy Jr., who endorsed the former President. To do so, he would tackle the chronic disease epidemic by going after the pharmaceutical industry and ultraprocessed foods. The former President initially promised to replace the Affordable Care Act, which he had attempted in 2017. However, by the end of the election season, he ruled out altering the Affordable Care Act, going as far as to claim that he "never even thought about such a thing". Trump also insisted that he would keep Medicare and Social Security intact. In March 2024, after alluding to cutting "entitlements," which was avidly denounced by the Biden campaign, he clarified that this did not include Medicare or Social Security. Ultimately, Trump did not commit to reforming welfare programs. He also pledged to make in-vitro fertilization free of charge.

=== Immigration ===
In one town, in Ohio, as you know, they have a beautiful town of—think of this—50,000 people. And they dumped 30,000 migrants into the town. … It's a whole different world. It can't be—we can't allow this to happen. They're destroying our country. November 5th, 2024, will be liberation day in America. On day one, I will launch the largest deportation program of criminals in American history. I will rescue every city and town that has been invaded and conquered.

— Donald Trump in his final rally at Grand Rapids, Michigan

The New York Times reported that Trump planned a mass deportation of illegal immigrants: "an extreme expansion of his first-term crackdown on immigration", including "preparing to round up undocumented people already in the U.S. on a vast scale and detain them in sprawling camps while they wait to be expelled", and that it "amounts to an assault on immigration on a scale unseen in modern American history". To achieve the goal of deporting millions per year, Trump has stated his intent to expand a form of deportation that does not require due process hearings which would be accomplished by invoking the Alien Enemies Act of 1798, and invoking the Insurrection Act of 1807 to allow the military to apprehend migrants. ICE raids would be expanded to include workplace raids and sweeps in public places. Following arrest, Stephen Miller has stated that immigrants would be taken to "large-scale staging grounds near the border, most likely in Texas" to be held in internment camps prior to deportation.

During rallies, Trump blurred the distinction between legal and illegal immigrants, and has promised to deport both. Trump stated he will deport between 15 and 20 million people, although the estimated number of undocumented immigrants is only 11 million. This was estimated by the American Immigration Council to cost at least $315 billion, or $967.9 billion over a decade, and by the Brookings Institution and Peterson Institute for International Economics to result in a decrease in employment for American-born workers".

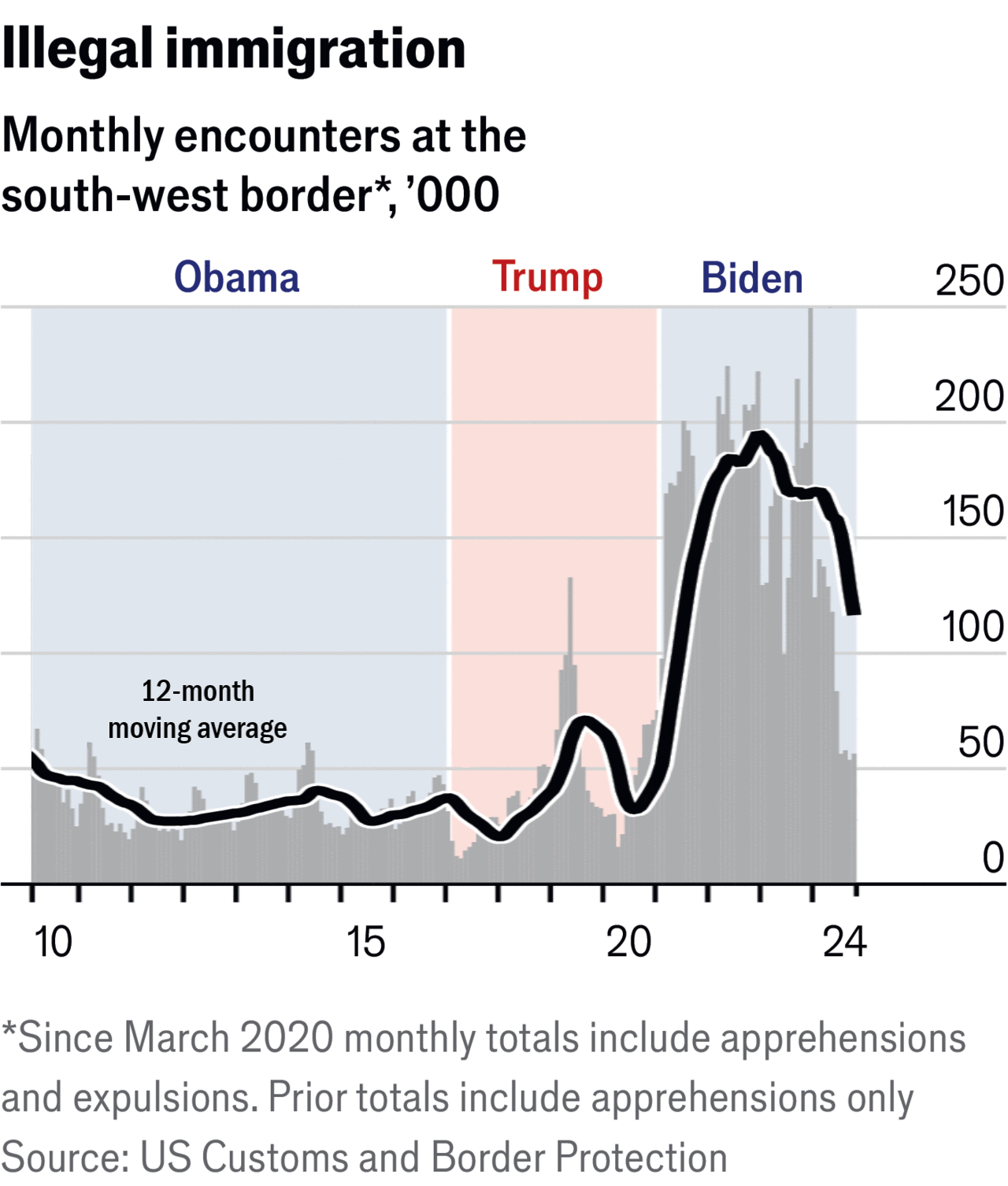
An alternate version of Trump's "favorite chart" that he displayed in rallies to corroborate his calls for mass deportations

Trump promised to reinstate his ban on entry to individuals from certain Muslim-majority nations. Trump has said he would build more of the border wall, and move thousands of troops currently stationed overseas to the southern border.

=== Law enforcement ===
We will crush the violent crime that's plaguing our cities and give our police the support, protection, resources, and respect they so dearly deserve. They will stop the crime.

— Donald Trump in an October 2024 rally at Greensboro, North Carolina

Trump ran on a pro-police "law and order" platform. Calling out crime and homelessness in Democratic-run cities was a central message of his, which often devolved into exaggerated reports of violence and disorder overrunning the country. Despite this, statistics consistently showed that violent crime had decreased since 2020. Trump repeatedly made baseless claims of a "migrant crime wave" caused by the crisis at the Southern border.

To resolve this imagined crime wave, he planned for mass deportations and more aggressive police use of force. He suggested sending the National Guard into crime-struck cities and reserving Justice Department grants to cities that adopt his preferred policing methods such as stop-and-frisk. The former President voiced support for shooting suspected shoplifters and having police carry out "one really violent day" against those committing property crimes. He pledged to expand use of the death penalty, including for drug dealers, smugglers, and migrants who kill American citizens and law enforcement officers. Regarding homelessness, he campaigned on banning urban camping and instead creating "tent cities" on inexpensive land. These would be staffed with doctors and social workers to help the homeless seek treatment.

Trump repeatedly voiced support for outlawing political dissent and criticism he considers misleading or challenges his claims to power. Trump and his allies have reportedly drafted executive orders to invoke the 1807 Insurrection Act on the first day of his presidency to allow the military to shut down civil demonstrations against him. Campaigning in Iowa, Trump stated he would deploy the military in Democratic cities and states.

Trump suggested investigating MSNBC and NBC's parent corporation Comcast should he return to office, calling their news coverage of him "treason". Similarly, he pledged to prosecute Google for only displaying "bad stories" about him. He also stated that ABC and CBS should lose their broadcast licenses and their journalists sent to jail if they refused to name confidential sources.

=== Transgenderism and civil rights ===
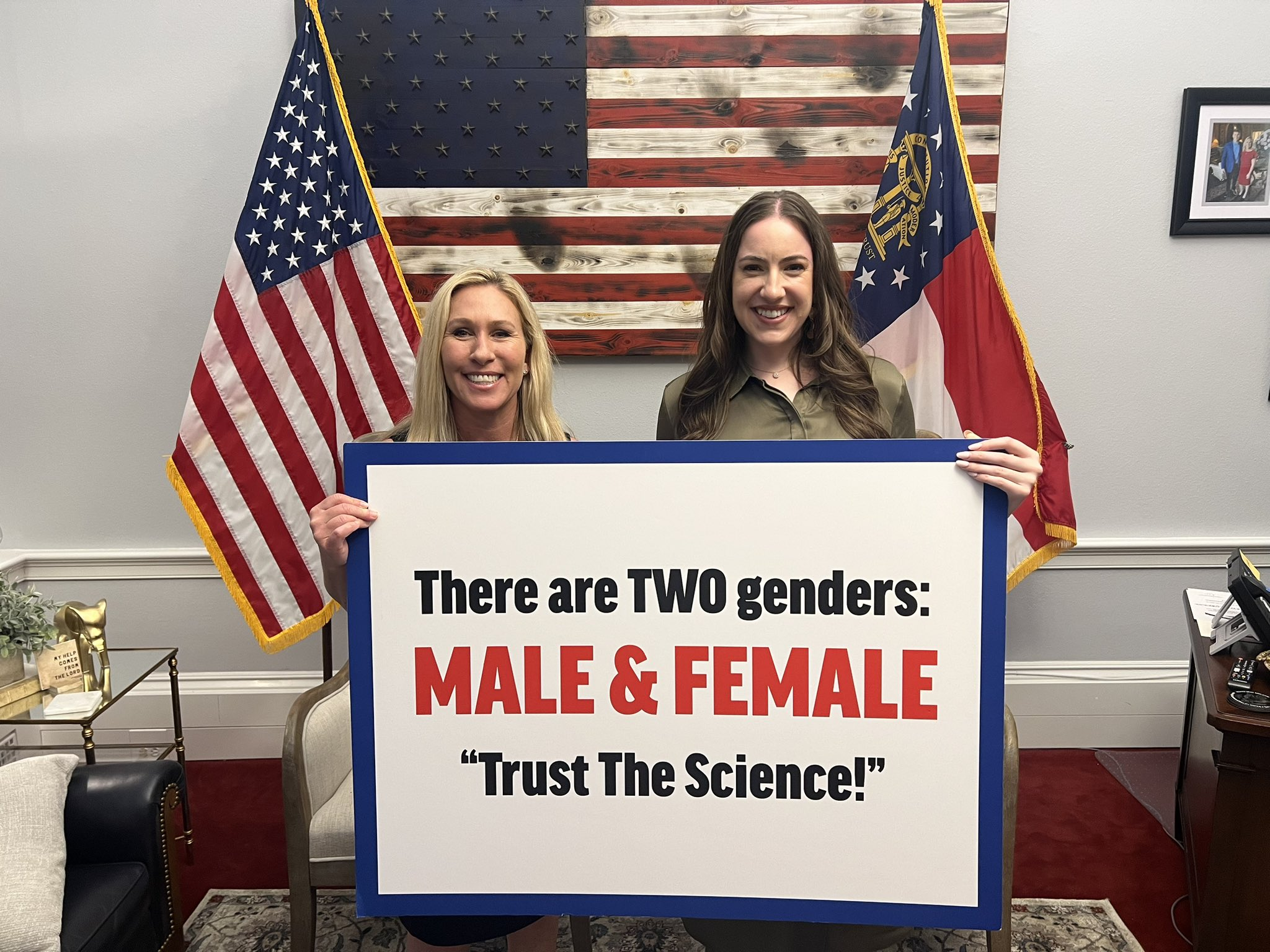
Georgia representative Marjorie Taylor Greene and Libs of TikTok founder Chaya Raichik, two Trump advocates and proponents of the 2020s reaction against the LGBTQ community; Trump's policies reflected this sentiment

Trump's campaign has stated its intention to reinterpret existing Civil Rights-era protections for minorities to counter "anti-white racism". According to Axios, Trump's Justice Department would "push to eliminate or upend programs in government and corporate America that are designed to counter racism that has favored whites". Trump has stated that there is a "definite anti-white feeling in the country". Trump's advisors have stated Trump will rescind Biden's Executive Orders designed to boost diversity and racial equity. Trump pledged a federal task force to fight the “persecution against Christians in America”.

Trump promised a rollback on trans rights. Trump stated he will rescind Biden's Title IX protections "on day one" for transgender students using bathrooms, locker rooms, and pronouns that align with their gender identities. Trump has stated that he will ask Congress to pass a bill stating that the U.S. will only recognize two genders as determined at birth, and has promised to crackdown on gender-affirming care. Trump has stated that hospitals and health care providers that provide transitional hormones or surgery will no longer qualify for federal funding, including Medicare and Medicaid funding. Trump has stated he will push to prohibit hormonal and surgical intervention for minors in all 50 states.

Trump's campaign has been more accepting on lesbian, gay, and bisexual rights. During the drafting of the Republican Party's 2024 presidential platform, he advocated for a more tolerant position on same-sex marriage and successfully removed language that supported conversion therapy.

== Rhetoric ==
The great silent majority is rising like never before. And under our leadership, the forgotten man and woman will be forgotten no longer. You’re going to be forgotten no longer. With your help, your love and your vote, we will put America first.

And today, especially in honor of our great veterans on Veterans Day, we pledge to you that we will root out the communists, Marxists, fascists and the radical-left thugs that live like vermin within the confines of our country, that lie and steal and cheat on elections and will do anything possible—they’ll do anything, whether legally or illegally, to destroy America and to destroy the American dream.

The real threat is not from the radical right. The real threat is from the radical left. And it is growing every day. Every single day.

— Donald Trump in a November 2023 rally at Claremont, New Hampshire

Trump's campaign rhetoric received immense media coverage. According to myriad journalists and scholars, and even—to an extent—Trump's own team, it was dark, vulgar, incendiary, and extreme, more so than that of any political candidate in U.S. history. His rhetoric was noted to degenerate as the campaign progressed. For instance, in a November 2023 rally, Trump said, "[W]e pledge to you that we will root out the communists, Marxists, fascists, and the radical-left thugs that live like vermin within the confines of our country". Eleven months later, he stated, "I think the bigger problem is the enemy from within. … We have some very bad people. We have some sick people, radical left lunatics. And I think they’re the big—and it should be very easily handled by, if necessary, by the National Guard, or if really necessary, by the military". Two days before the election, he told rallygoers, "[T]o get me somebody would have to shoot through the fake news [reporters]. And I don't mind that so much". In deploying such vitriolic language, Trump aimed to energize his base as well as undecided voters, in order to maximize turnout.

Trump's way of speaking throughout the campaign, especially in its final months, was described as aggressive and erratic. In fact, many commentators remarked that he "rambled" more than he spoke. According to a New York Times computer analysis, since the initiation of Trump's political career in 2015, his speeches had grown "darker, harsher, longer, angrier, less focused, more profane and increasingly fixated on the past". The former President would talk about one subject and then abruptly go off on a tangent, often droning on about a different matter, and eventually return to the main subject.

Trump often mumbled words; he once confused "double entendre" for "double standard," referred to Assyrians as "Azurasians", and, in 2022, mixed up JD Vance with Josh Mandel and thus produced "JD Mandel". His speech teemed with hyperbole and superlatives. Peter Baker of The New York Times wrote, "Nuance, subtlety, precision and ambiguity play no role in the version that Mr. Trump promotes with relentless repetition", as Trump attacked Biden for being "the worst president in U.S. history", and spoke of himself as "the greatest president" in U.S history. Vulgarities were also a hallmark of the former President's rhetoric. In one of his final rallies, for example, he rambled about the size of Arnold Palmer's genitals. Overall, Trump's language took on a more negative and violent tone, with a Conversation analysis finding that 1.6% of the total words uttered in his 2024 campaign denoted violence, compared to 0.6% in 2016, and the aforementioned New York Times survey finding a 50% increase in negative words.

=== Attacks ===
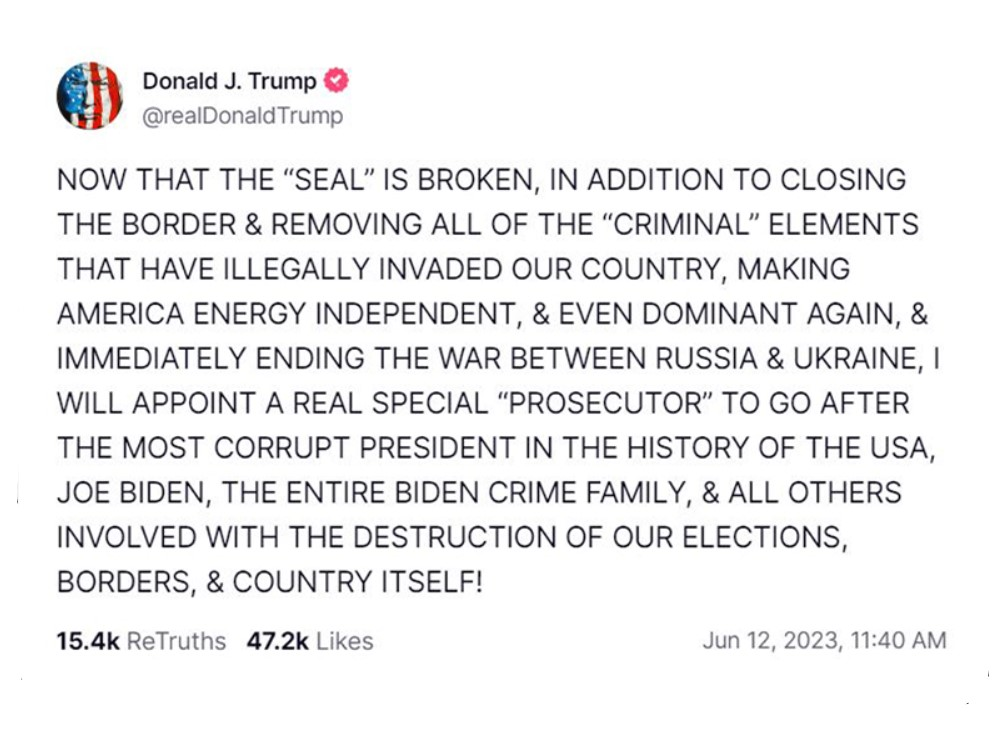
A Trump post on Truth Social dated June 2023, in which he condemns the U.S. Justice Department for supposedly targeting him, and vows to go after political opponents

Trump's campaign deployed dehumanizing, violent attacks against his political opponents. His election rival, Harris, was a prime target. In a July 2024 interview, he falsely said that she had claimed Indian heritage "until a number of years ago when she happened to turn Black, and now she wants to be known as Black". Oftentimes, Trump intentionally mispronounced her name as "Ka-MA-la", or "Kamabla", and called her "low IQ", "mentally disabled", and "a shit vice president". Other political opponents got similar treatments. In September 2023, Trump said that Mark Milley, his appointed chairman of the Joint Chiefs of Staff who had come to criticize him, deserved "DEATH!" for his phone calls with a Chinese general. He urged deploying the military to fight "the enemy from within": the "enemy" being "radical left lunatics" and certain Democratic politicians. Another enemy, according to him, was the media. He called Facebook "an enemy of the people", and complained that the media was "so damn bad". Moreover, Trump attacked the witnesses, judges, juries, and families of individuals involved in his criminal trials. In the aftermath of his prosecution in New York, he called Judge Juan Merchan, "a devil" and urged his supporters to "go after" Letitia James, the attorney who filed the suit.

=== Extremist statements ===
I’m not going to call this as a prediction, but in my opinion, the Jewish people would have a lot to do with a loss … If I don’t win this election—and the Jewish people would really have a lot to do with that if that happens because if 40%, I mean, 60% of the people are voting for the enemy …

— Donald Trump in a September 2024 rally, an assertion recalling the stab-in-the-back myth adopted by Adolf Hitler to explain Germany's loss in World War One

Trump's campaign statements were connected to an embrace of right-wing extremism. He proclaimed that undocumented immigrants were "poisoning the blood of our country" and had "bad genes," which, according to some commentators, strikingly resembled Hitler and white supremacists' racial hygiene rhetoric. On Veterans Day 2023, he called some of his political opponents "vermin," which also seemed to echo Hitler and Benito Mussolini's language. In May 2024, Trump's campaign posted an advertisement which showed hypothetical newspaper headlines in the event of a Trump victory. Under one headline titled "What's next for America?" was a subtitle that read, "German industrial strength significantly increased after 1871, driven by the creation of a unified Reich".

Some of Trump's statements were perceived as an open embrace of authoritarianism. In a December 2023 interview with Sean Hannity, the former President said he would only be a dictator on "day one" of his presidency and not after. His campaign aides later stated that he was merely attempting to "trigger the left" and media establishment. Trump also stated that, in order to reverse his loss in the 2020 election, the U.S. Constitution had to be terminated. Several Republicans, including Ted Cruz, denounced this remark. Trump publicly praised several authoritarian leaders during his campaign such as Viktor Orbán: "There’s nobody that’s better, smarter or a better leader than Viktor Orbán. He’s fantastic".

=== Ideology ===
Scholars and commentators contended that Trump's rhetoric stemmed from populism. A common theme in his rallies was the struggle between "us"—the majority, or his supporters—and "them"—the elites, or his political enemies. In contrast with previous runs, Trump stressed the "them," not the "us," who he claimed had targeted him; "When they start playing with your elections and trying to arrest their political opponent — I can do that, too!", he once said. This led the University of California, Los Angeles to deem Trump's 2024 brand of populism "negative populism". A study of theirs found that it was less focused on policy, such as economic performance, and more on violent attacks on opponents. Frequent targets of his attacks were illegal immigrants, transgender people, and the elites, made in an attempt to create an outgroup to stir up fear and moral panic among his supporters. The University of California, Berkeley ties this strategy to "authoritarian populism". It elaborates, "[The] sense of fear and antagonism [promoted] leads people to accept authoritarian measures to protect themselves and their in-group". Another effect of Trump's framing of certain people as an outgroup was airing the public's grievances, especially on the surge in illegal immigration and the political establishment. This turned him into the "ultimate" symbol of victimhood.

In fact, a central motif of Trump's campaign was martyrdom. He portrayed himself as a victim of the "deep state" actively attempting to undermine him and the country. His criminal trials made him, in his words, a "political prisoner," similar to Alexei Navalny. Alongside martyrdom, a common motif was retribution. He framed the election as "the final battle", and his presidential campaign as a "righteous crusade" against "atheists, globalists and the Marxists". Trump referred to the January 6 Capitol attack to back his retribution narrative. During rallies, imprisoned participants of the attack were brought up as patriotic "warriors" and "hostages," symbols of political injustice. Furthermore, Trump's populism blended with nationalism, as his calls for retribution against illegal immigrants and globalist elites were enmeshed with calls to defend the American identity.

A core feature of the former President's populist rhetoric was his defiance of norms of political speech. This was captured through vulgar insults against opponents and violent diction. According to Lilie Chouliaraki and Kathryn Claire Higgins of the London School of Economics and Political Sciences, Trump spoke with "an irreverent, improvised and unencumbered brashness that suggests that he is saying out loud what everyone else is too afraid to say". Robert C. Rowland, author of The Rhetoric of Donald Trump, opined that his breaking of rhetorical norms "can be seen as proof of authenticity, but if taken too far it can lead to ridicule, dealing a devastating blow to someone who has styled himself as the strongman protector of ordinary people". The aforementioned populist overtones bore parallels to authoritarian leaders. The former President's rhetoric was unprecedentedly vitriolic and extreme to the point that some scholars and journalists labelled it as fascist, comparable to that of Juan Perón, Fidel Castro, and Adolf Hitler.

Christian nationalism also defined Trump's rhetoric. In his rallies, he alleged that Christianity was being besieged and Christians were facing persecution by Democrats, and that he would guard it and reclaim its rightful role in U.S. society. The former President and his allies appealed to Christians' grievances by calling out "woke indoctrination" in schools, trans rights initiatives, and even the crisis at the Southern border. To this extent, their partisan conservative messaging and Christian messaging were indistinguishable. The conservative pastor Guillermo Maldonado said of the election, "You know, we’re now in spiritual warfare … It’s beyond warfare between the left and the right. It’s between good and evil. There’s a big fight right now that is affecting our country and we need to take back our country". Oftentimes, Trump cast himself as a messiah. Following his assassination attempt in Pennsylvania, he claimed that "God saved me for a purpose, and that’s to make our country greater than ever before". To this end, the campaign catered to the Christian and evangelical vote.

=== Disinformation ===
Trump's sowing of election doubt throughout the campaign compared with his two previous runs

Throughout the campaign, Trump spread many lies and misleading claims, to the extent that journalists found it "especially difficult" to keep up with them. They found that he created an alternate reality: an America in which 15 million illegal immigrants, not 5 million, had entered the country under Biden, and in which inflation had gone up to 50%, not 9%. During a 64-minute news conference of his held in August 2024, NPR counted over 162 lies, misstatements, and vast exaggerations, an average of more than two per minute. Trump repeatedly embraced conspiracies such as QAnon. There was a strategy behind this persistent lying. By "flooding the zone with shit," Trump's campaign received unrivaled media attention, and better resonated with voters disillusioned by the Biden administration. Vance himself admitted, "If I have to create stories so that the American media actually pays attention to the suffering of the American people, then that’s what I’m going to do". Moreover, repeated lies tethered Trump's base even closer to him, fostering loyalty to the point that he could not be held accountable for his actions. This method paralleled the firehose of falsehood propaganda tactic.

Another method was the big lie, defined as disinformation "so grand that it is difficult to believe that someone would have the gall to make [it] up". From as early as 2020, he incessantly claimed that that year's election was rigged, so much so that it developed into a big lie. This narrative would be repeated throughout the campaign. He, and his allies, spoke of "election integrity" not just to motivate the Republican base, but to cast doubt on the U.S. electoral process, with the ultimate aim of enfeebling democracy. In the lead up to the 2024 election, they made false claims of massive noncitizen voting by illegal immigrants in a Democratic operation to steal the election. In reality, voter fraud is extremely rare. Trump vilified mail-in voting and early voting, two alleged culprits of voter fraud, even as Republicans were advising supporters to use those voting methods in the coming election. When Trump was struck with criminal prosecutions, another big lie ensued—that he was completely innocent. Some commentators described the former President's attribution of his "defeats" to a "rigged" system as a "heads I win, tails you cheated" strategy.

=== Fearmongering ===
There's one request. It's very important. Register to vote. OK? And get everyone you know and everyone you don't know, drag them to register to vote. There's only two days left to register to vote in Georgia and Arizona, 48 hours. Like, text people now. Now. And then make sure they actually do vote. If they don't, this will be the last election.

— Elon Musk, a prominent Trump ally, in an October 2024 rally at Butler, Pennsylvania

Trump's campaign heavily relied on fearmongering. He inflated the economic, crime, and immigration-related state of the U.S. to paint an image of a nation in ruins, a "failed" "Third World" country, in his words. On Biden's economy, he alleged that inflation was the highest it had ever been. On crime, commentators viewed Trump's version of the U.S. as "dystopian". Trump made apocalyptic prophecies predicting imminent doom should he lose the election, including the break out of World War Three.

Two frequent targets of Trump's fearmongering were illegal immigrants and transgender people. He repeatedly used racial stereotypes and dehumanizing rhetoric to paint the influx of illegal immigrants as an assault—an "invasion"—on the American public, citing baseless accounts of their proclivity for crime. At rallies, the former President stated that they will "walk in your kitchen, they'll cut your throat", and "grab young girls and slice them up right in front of their parents". On multiple occasions, Trump and Republicans promoted the conspiracy that Haitian immigrants in Springfield, Ohio, were looting and eating people's pets. As a result of their efforts, dozens of bomb threats emerged targeting Springfield schools, hospitals, public buildings, and businesses. Besides illegal immigrants, Trump used transgender people as scapegoats. He attempted to incite a moral panic over their interference in politics and society, falsely warning that children in schools were being forced into gender reassignment surgery, and that trans women were unfairly infiltrating in women's sports. Fear drew voters wary of illegal immigration and transgenderism to sympathize with Trump's message, according to commentators. It also energized conservative adherents of his.

== Struggle for the Republican nomination ==
=== Primaries ===
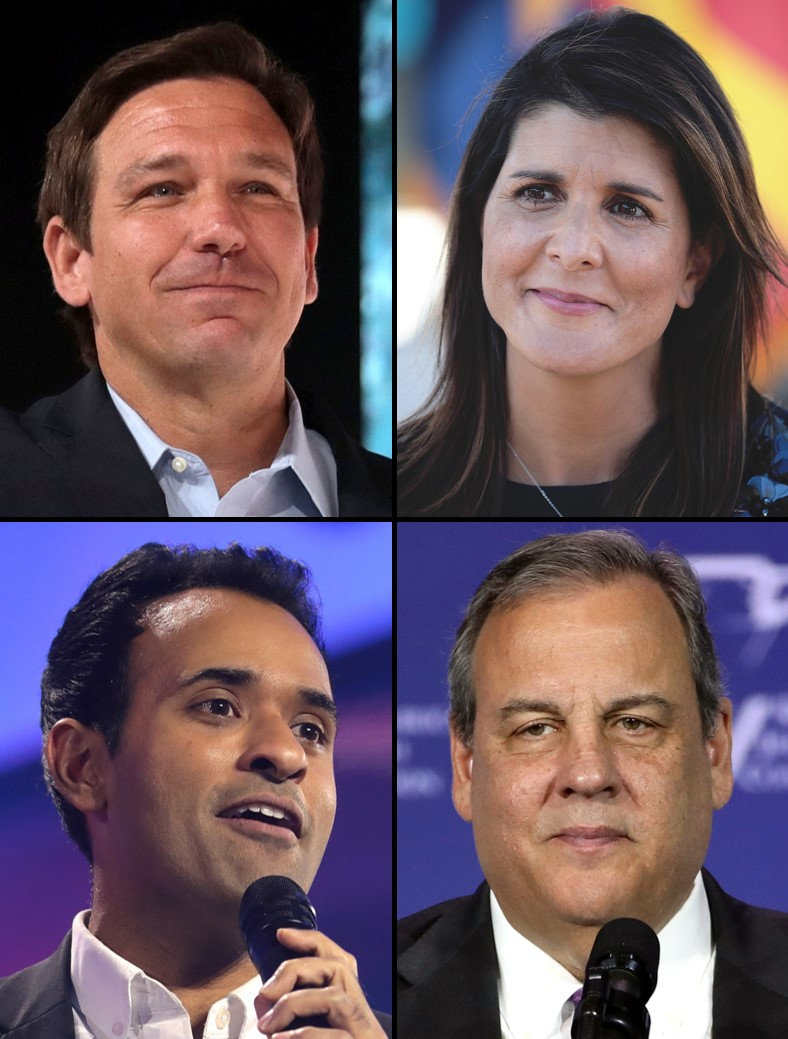
The main rivals to Trump for the Republican nomination: Ron DeSantis, Nikki Haley, Vivek Ramaswamy, and Chris Christie (left to right, top row first)

As of late November 2022, Quinnipiac reported that 34% of Americans expressed approval of Donald Trump's candidacy, including just 62% of Republicans. Some two months after its inception, only 30 out of 271 congressional Republicans had endorsed him.

Trump was challenged in the primaries by Nikki Haley (February 14, 2023, to March 6, 2024), Vivek Ramaswamy (February 21, 2023, to January 15, 2024), Asa Hutchinson (April 6, 2023, to January 16, 2024), and Ron DeSantis (May 24, 2023, to January 21, 2024).

Other challengers, who withdrew before the primaries, were Perry Johnson (March 2, 2023, to October 20, 2023), Larry Elder (April 20, 2023, to October 26, 2023), Tim Scott (May 19, 2023, to November 12, 2023), Mike Pence (June 5, 2023, to October 28, 2023), Chris Christie (June 6, 2023, to January 10, 2024), Doug Burgum (June 7, 2023, to December 4, 2023), Francis Suarez (June 14, 2023, to August 29, 2023), and Will Hurd (June 22, 2023, to October 9, 2023).

From August 23 to January 10, 2024, there were five debates among the candidates in the campaign for the Republican Party's nomination for president. Trump was absent from all of them, and was not planning to attend the debates scheduled for January 18 and 21, 2024. On January 16, when she and Ron DeSantis were the last challengers left, Nikki Haley announced she would not attend the January 18 debate unless Donald Trump took part in it. ABC News canceled that debate, and CNN canceled the January 21 one.

By mid-January 2024, Politico reported that a majority of congressional Republicans had come out in favor of Trump.

After winning the primaries in Washington, D.C. (March 3) and Vermont (March 5), Haley suspended her presidential campaign the day after Super Tuesday.

National primary polling showed Trump leading by 50 points over other candidates during the Republican primaries. After he won a landslide victory in the 2024 Iowa Republican presidential caucuses, Trump was generally described as being the Republican Party's presumptive nominee for president. On March 12, 2024, Trump officially became the presumptive nominee of the Republican Party.

=== Support and opposition to Trump's nomination ===
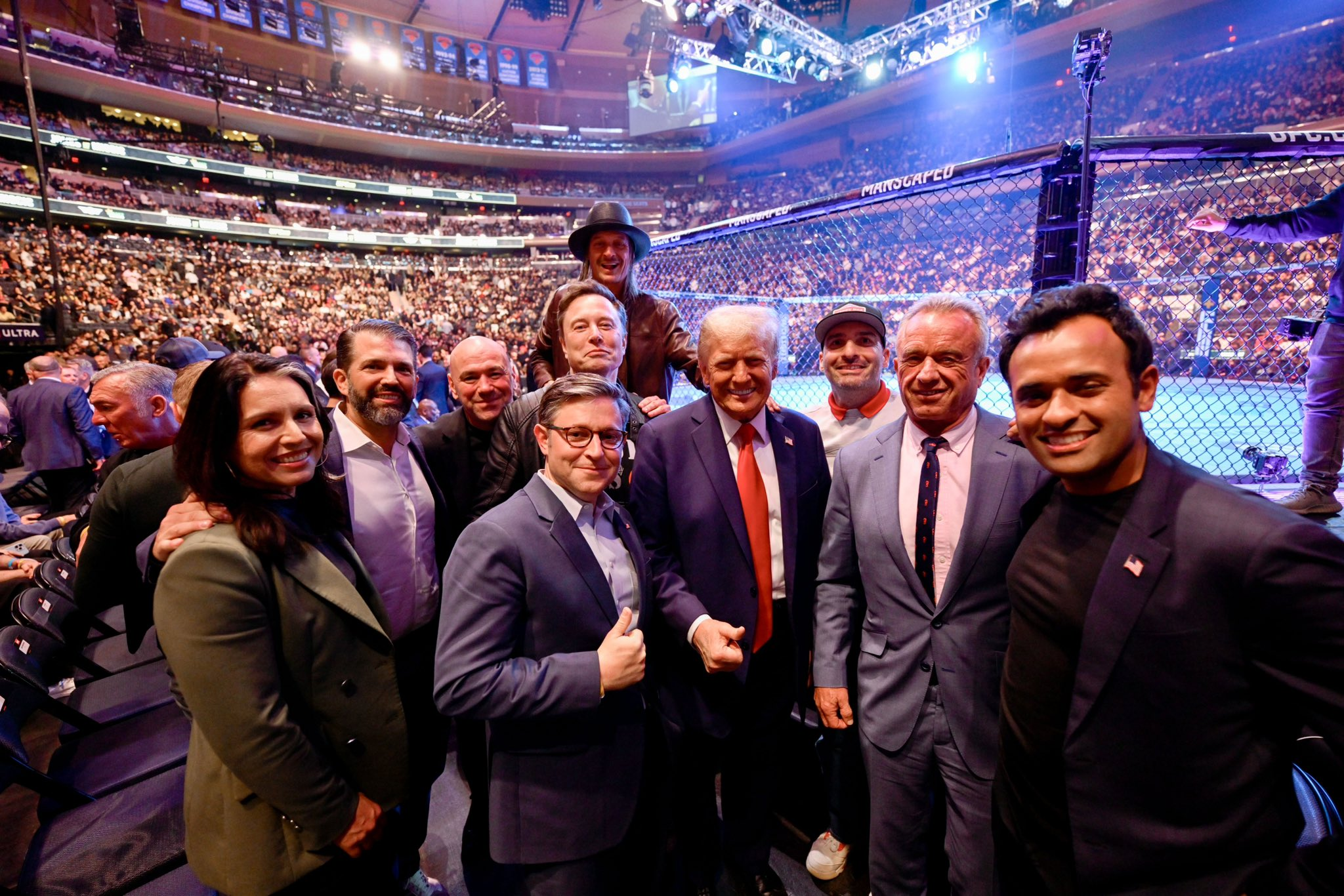
Trump alongside some of his preeminent supporters in 2024 at a UFC fight: Tulsi Gabbard, Donald Trump Jr., Dana White, Mike Johnson, Elon Musk, Kid Rock, Robert F. Kennedy Jr., and Vivek Ramaswamy (left to right)

Although initially hesitant to back the former President's campaign, most Republican officials quickly rallied behind Trump as the primaries progressed. Many of his primary opponents came to endorse him. Trump's criminal prosecutions and first assassination attempt continued to unite the Republican Party's support for the former President. Besides Republican officials, many podcasters and social media influencers stood behind Trump. Other prominent endorsements included Kid Rock, Jason Aldean, Kanye West, Buzz Aldrin, Mel Gibson, Hulk Hogan, and Amber Rose.

Sarah Palin was the only former Republican president, vice president or nominee to back Trump. Notable Republican politicians who either opposed or declined to announce their support publicly include former president George W. Bush, former vice presidents Mike Pence, and Dick Cheney, former House Speakers John Boehner and Paul Ryan, as well as former representatives Liz Cheney and Adam Kinzinger. Some of Trump's 2016 and 2024 primary opponents such as Jeb Bush, John Kasich, Carly Fiorina, Chris Christie, Asa Hutchinson, and Will Hurd also declined to endorse or openly opposed the campaign. Republican organizations such as 43 Alumni for America, Haley Voters for Harris, and The Lincoln Project all endorsed Harris. Half of the members of Trump's cabinet did not support his run for president.

=== Vice-presidential choice ===
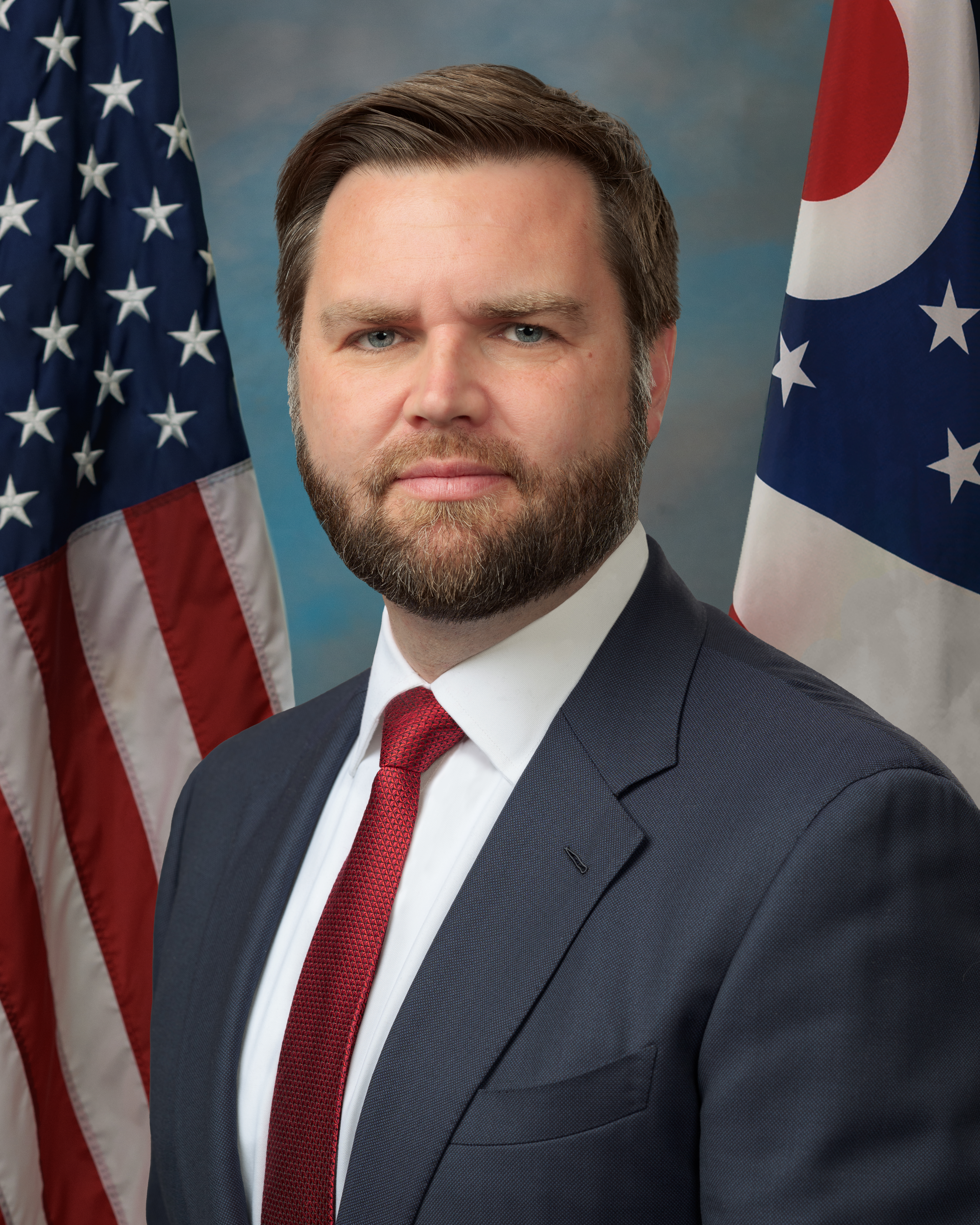
Ohio senator JD Vance, Trump's running mate in 2024

Mike Pence served as Trump's vice president from 2017 to 2021, as well as his running mate in 2020. However, the pair had a dramatic falling out on January 6, 2021, when Pence refused to follow Trump's orders to deny the certification of the 2020 election results. The President thereafter tweeted that Pence "didn’t have the courage to do what should have been done to protect our country and our constitution". As early as March 2021, Bloomberg News reported that Trump had largely ruled out sharing a ticket with Pence in 2024. At least sixteen names were raised as possible candidates for the position.

Reported Republican candidates for vice president
- Doug Burgum, governor of North Dakota (2016–2024) and former 2024 presidential candidate
- Tucker Carlson, political commentator
- Ben Carson, former Secretary of Housing and Urban Development (2017–2021) and 2016 presidential candidate
- Tom Cotton, senator from Arkansas (2015–present)
- Byron Donalds, representative from Florida's 19th congressional district (2021–present)
- Tulsi Gabbard, former representative from Hawaii's 2nd congressional district (2013–2021) and 2020 Democratic presidential candidate
- Nikki Haley, former governor of South Carolina (2011–2017), former ambassador to the United Nations, and former 2024 presidential candidate
- Robert F. Kennedy Jr., environmental lawyer and independent 2024 presidential candidate (Note: In January 2024, Kennedy claimed that Trump had approached him to be his running mate and that he had refused the offer. Trump campaign advisor Chris LaCivita denied that the Trump campaign had ever approached Kennedy to be Trump's running mate, however, and added that they had no plans on ever doing so. In April, however, multiple sources close to Trump once again reported that he was considering Kennedy.)
- Kari Lake, former news anchor and 2024 candidate for senator from Arizona
- Kristi Noem, governor of South Dakota (2019–2025)
- Vivek Ramaswamy, businessman and former 2024 presidential candidate
- Marco Rubio, senator from Florida (2011–2025) and 2016 presidential candidate
- Sarah Huckabee Sanders, governor of Arkansas (2023–present) and former White House press secretary (2017–2019)
- Tim Scott, senator from South Carolina (2013–present) and former 2024 presidential candidate
- Elise Stefanik, representative from New York's 21st congressional district (2015–present)
- JD Vance, senator from Ohio (2023–2025)

By June, the Trump campaign had reportedly delivered vetting paperwork to Burgum, Carson, Cotton, Donalds, Rubio, Scott, Stefanik, and Vance. Ultimately, JD Vance was chosen to be Trump's running mate. Media analysts deduced this pick to an attempt to court Midwestern and white working-class voters. At 39, he also provided a counterbalance to Trump, 78 years old at the time. Vance's conservative stances, such as his isolationism and prior opposition to abortion even in cases of rape or incest, established the campaign's full commitment to Trumpism. Vance was the first Ohioan to appear on a major party presidential ticket since John Bricker in 1944, and the first veteran since John McCain in 2008. He was also the first millennial and veteran of the Iraq war (and the wider war on terror) on a presidential ticket.

=== Republican National Convention ===
On July 15, 2024, Trump and Vance were officially named the Republican candidates for president and vice president in Republican National Convention at Milwaukee. Trump formally accepted the party's nomination in a 90-minute address on the convention's final night, just two days after his assassination attempt in Pennsylvania.

== History of the campaign ==
=== Rallies ===
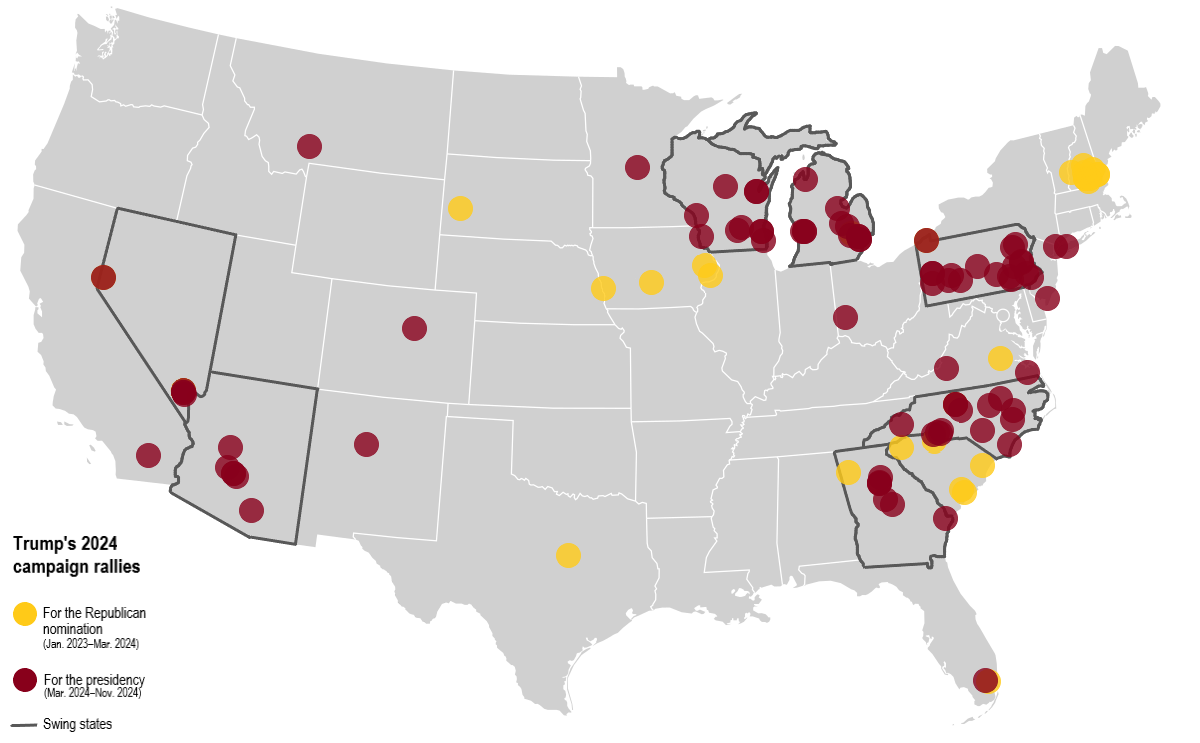
Trump's 2024 campaign rallies, the vast majority of which were held in the seven battleground states of Wisconsin, Michigan, Pennsylvania, North Carolina, Georgia, Arizona, and Nevada

Trump's rallies drew extensive media coverage. They were described as "freewheeling" and "loose-cannon", a blend of vitriol, grievances, insults, and apocalyptic narratives that stood in contrast to Harris' more traditional, unifying style. Some commentators likened them to concerts and carnivals. The former president would, in the words of Jill Colvin and Bill Barrow, "[meander] between policy proposals, personal stories and jokes, attacks on his opponents and complaints that he is being persecuted by the courts, and dire warnings about the country’s future". Trump's rallies were notably long, as he would often speak for over 90 minutes. On average, Harris would speak for an hour less, and even he spoke for 37 minutes less in the 2016 campaign, according to separate New York Times analyses. In his final rallies, Trump often arrived very late—at one time, three hours late— and appeared deprived of energy. Many attendees would leave, bothered by his tardiness, belligerent rhetoric, and the rally's length. About 30% had fled by the end of a rally at Marietta, Georgia. In September 2024, Axios reported that he had held much fewer rallies than in his 2016 run.

The most prominent songs used by Trump's campaign were "God Bless the U.S.A." by Lee Greenwood, "Hold On, I'm Comin'" by Sam & Dave, "America First" by Merle Haggard, and "Y.M.C.A." by Village People. He also used music for which the artists and owners of copyrights were not compensated. One such use—that of "Hold On, I'm Comin'"—resulted in a federal injunction barring Trump from playing it in his rallies any longer. Frequent chants in his rallies were "Fight! Fight! Fight!" and "USA!".

=== Court cases ===
From 2023 up until the 2024 election, Trump was engulfed in legal battles. Trump's prosecutions, unprecedented in the nation's history, only bolstered his support, according to commentators. His funding surged, and the Republican Party grew ever more allegiant to him, although some commentators warned that moderate Republicans may have been alienated. Trump claimed his trial in New York was "rigged" and accused the Democratic Party of orchestrating his criminal trials to prevent him from returning to the White House, of which there is no evidence. In May 2024, Trump falsely claimed Joe Biden was ready to kill him during the FBI search of Mar-a-Lago by misrepresenting standard Justice Department policy on use of force. These statements played into his attempts to project himself as a martyr.

=== December 2022–March 2024 ===
==== Return to social media and establishment of Truth Social ====
In the wake of the January 6 Capitol attack, many of Trump's social media accounts were banned. In November 2022, Elon Musk, who had recently taken ownership of Twitter, reinstated Trump's accounts. A few months later, Facebook and Instagram followed suit.

In October 2021, Trump's own social media platform, Truth Social, was founding, to counter the social bans imposed on him. He would primarily use it to spread messages. It is alt-tech.

==== Dinner with Kanye West and Nick Fuentes ====
In November 2022, Kanye West, then a candidate for the 2024 election, dined with Trump at Mar-a-Lago, alongside white nationalist Nick Fuentes. West had recently posted a series of antisemitic statements on social media. Trump, on his part, claimed that this meeting was unexpected. At one point during the dinner, West asked Trump to be his running mate, after which the former President "started basically screaming at [West] at the table telling [him] [he] was going to lose". Republican candidates Asa Hutchinson and Mike Pence openly rebuked Fuentes' presence in Trump's campaign, and Mitch McConnell went as far as to suggest that he would not win the election because of the dinner. By October 2023, West had suspended his campaign. He endorsed Trump.

==== First campaign appearances ====
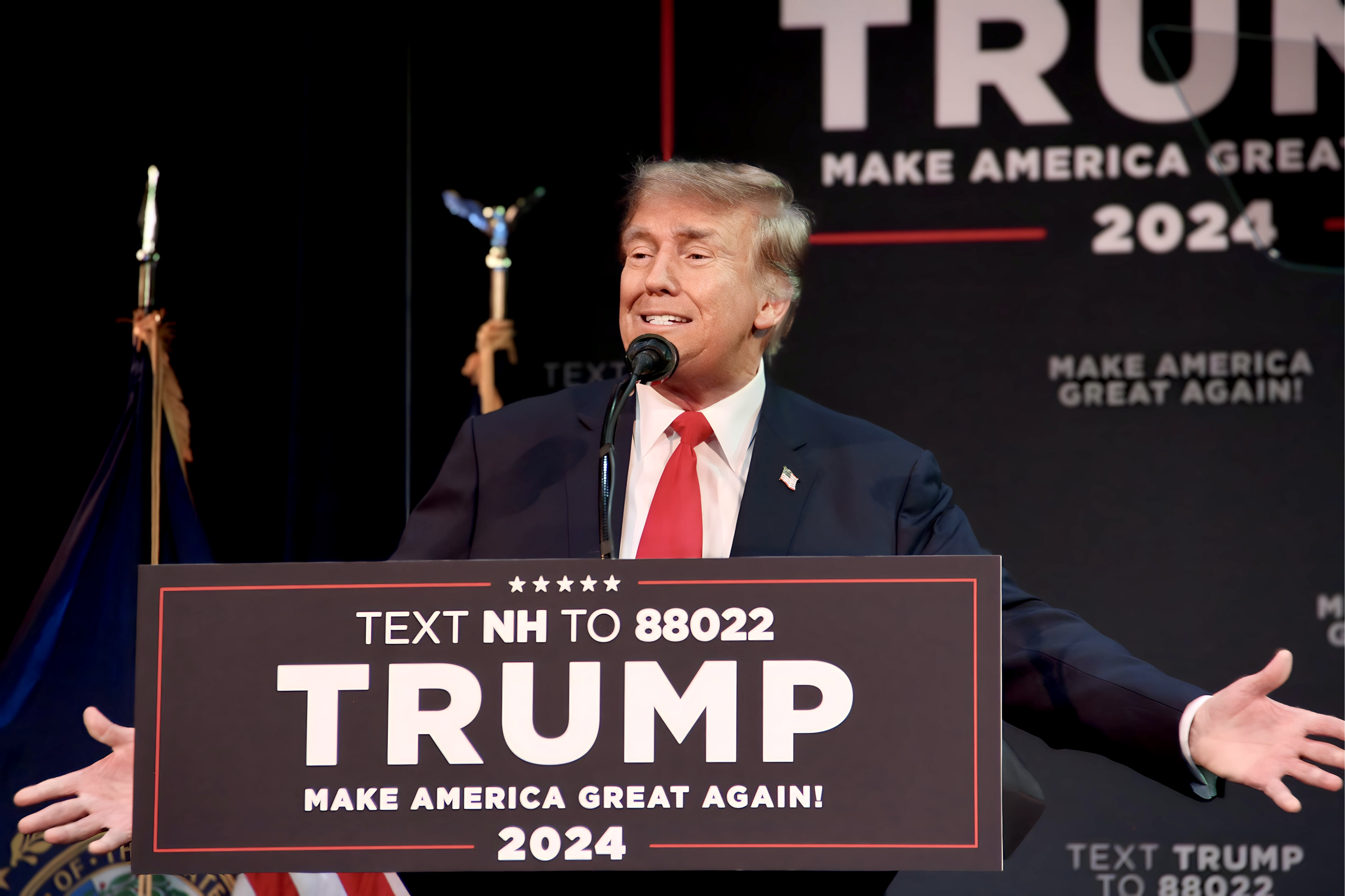
Trump at a rally in Rochester, New Hampshire, in January 2024

On January 28, 2023, Trump held his first campaign events in South Carolina and New Hampshire.

==== Indictments ====
In March 2023, he was indicted for 34 felony counts of fraud stemming from his role in falsifying business records concerning hush money paid to porn star Stormy Daniels, done in an attempt to influence the 2016 presidential election. This marked his first indictment of four. His second came in June, when a federal grand jury indicted the former President for improperly retaining classified documents at his Mar-a-Lago residence and destroying evidence related to the government probe. In August, Trump was indicted for his illegal attempts to remain in power following the 2020 election. This resulted in a mugshot being taken of him, which was widely circulated on the internet and raised his campaign over $7 million within two days of its release. Finally, later in August, the federal government and Georgia separately indicted him for criminal conspiracy and fraud vis-à-vis his efforts to overturn the results of the 2020 election. Trump denied wrongdoing in all four cases. Besides these indictments, he was found liable in a civil lawsuit for sexual abuse and defamation against journalist E. Jean Carroll.

=== March 2024–November 2024 ===
==== At the Libertarian National Convention ====
Trump spoke at the 2024 Libertarian National Convention in May, becoming the first president to address a third party convention in modern U.S. history. He urged the Libertarian Party to nominate him lest they "keep getting [their] 3% every four years". In an attempt to court the crowd, the former President vowed to appoint a Libertarian to his cabinet and commute Ross Ulbricht's prison sentence. However, his speech was blanketed with jeers; one attendee even held up a sign that read "No wannabe dictators!" Biden did not attend the convention. Come nomination day, Trump had been eliminated during balloting, and Chase Oliver was selected as the Libertarian nominee for president.

==== Felony conviction ====
In May 2024, Trump was convicted of felonies regarding the Stormy Daniels case. This made him the first former U.S. president ever to be convicted of a crime. After the election, he was given an "unconditional discharge," shielding him from punishment or incarceration.

==== Debate with Joe Biden ====
Trump's and Vance's respective opponents prior to Biden's withdrawal, then-presumptive Democratic nominees Joe Biden and Kamala Harris

On June 27, 2024, the first of two debates in the election season took place, with Trump up against Joe Biden in the initial rematch. The debate was defined by Biden's "disastrous" performance, as he rambled incoherently and repeatedly lost his train of thought. This exacerbated already-existing concerns about the President's fitness to serve. With Trump comfortably proclaimed the winner of the debate—an Ipsos/FiveThirtyEight poll found that 60% of respondents thought that Trump won, compared with only 21% for his opponent—the former President's lead in national polls expanded, and Democratic officials began calling for Biden to drop out of the race. Nevertheless, some commentators pointed out that Biden's poor performance merely overshadowed Trump's persistent lying throughout the debate. Doyle McManus of The Los Angeles Times opined that "nobody won, but Biden clearly lost".

==== Trump v. United States ====
In the legal case Trump v. United States, Trump argued that the Constitution allows for absolute immunity for all presidential actions—even those criminal—unless the Senate successfully votes to impeach. His argument was rejected by most political commentators and two lower courts. In a unanimous ruling by the three-judge panel of the U.S. Court of Appeals for the District of Columbia, the court stated that if Trump's theory of constitutional authority were accepted, it would "collapse our system of separated powers" and put a president above the law. Nevertheless, in July 2024, the U.S. Supreme Court sided with Trump in a partisan 6–3 decision. It determined that the Constitution affords the President with absolute immunity for acts within his constitutional purview and presumptive immunity for official acts, but provides no immunity for unofficial acts.

==== Attempted assassinations ====
One of Evan Vucci's iconic photographs of Trump following his assassination attempt at Butler
- View – via The Atlantic

In the span of three months, Trump faced two assassination attempts. On July 13, 2024, during a rally near Butler, Pennsylvania, he was shot and wounded in the upper right ear. He was escorted out of the venue by U.S. Secret Service. The Secret Service swiftly killed the identified shooter, Thomas Matthew Crooks. In addition, Crooks also shot three other spectators, including 50-year-old firefighter Corey Comperatore, who was killed instantly. The assassination attempt was memorialized in a series of photographs by Evan Vucci. These depict Trump being escorted off the podium, with blood coating his cheek, his fist raised defiantly, and an American flag fluttering in the background. Vucci's photographs became a symbol of the campaign. Commentators stated that the attempted assassination helped project Trump as a martyr, with Zachary Basu of Axios writing that it "turbocharge[d] the persecution narrative Trump has placed at the center of his campaign". It also cemented Republican unity behind his campaign.

Later, on September 15, 2024, Trump became the target of a second assassination attempt at the Trump International Golf Club in West Palm Beach, Florida. The secret service agent walking the course before Trump's golf party arrived at the hole and saw a rifle barrel protruding from the bushes which opened fire in that direction. The perpetrator, Ryan Wesley Routh, fled the scene but was quickly apprehended. Routh was eventually charged with attempted first-degree murder and terrorism.

==== Musk, Kennedy, and Gabbard's endorsements ====
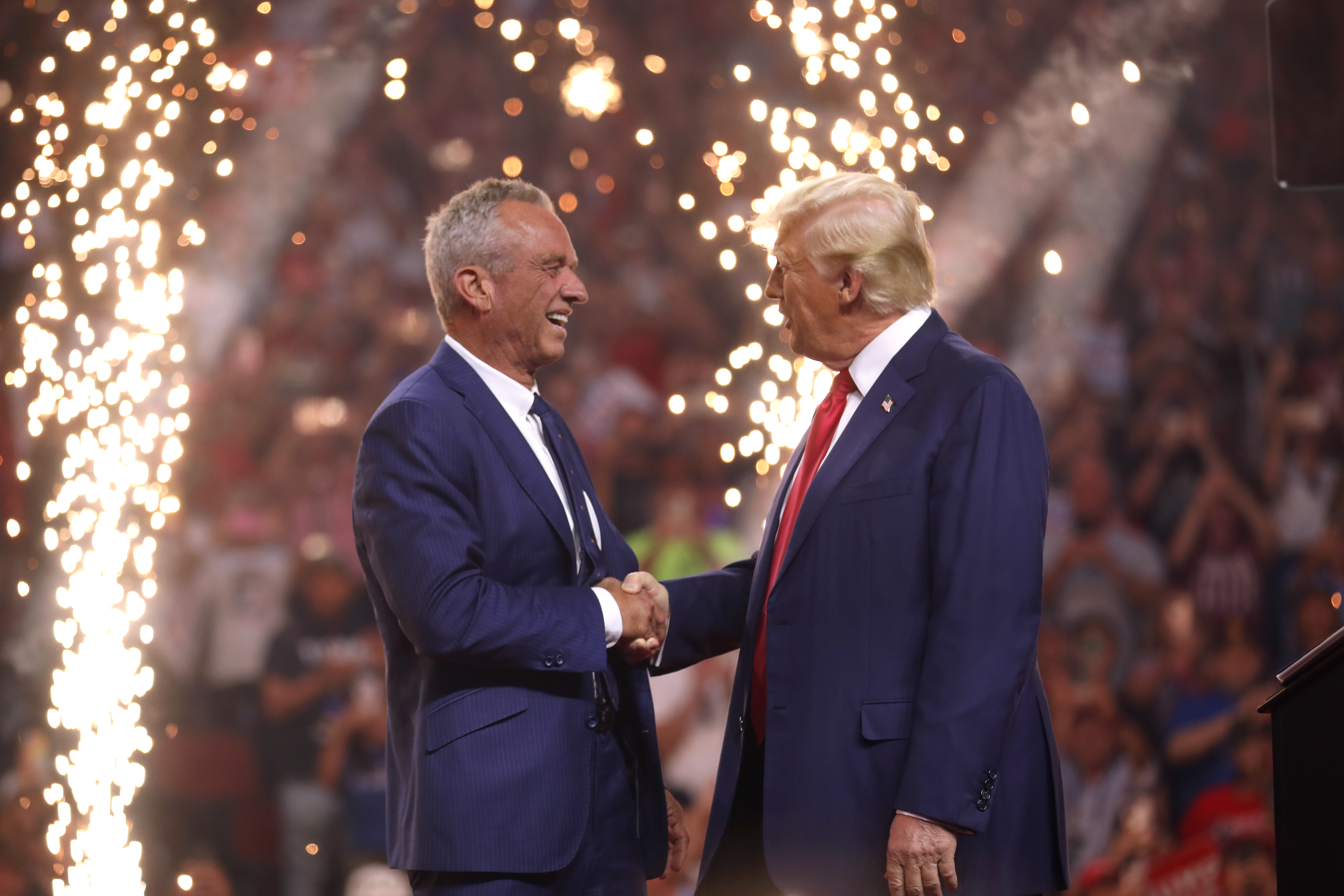
Robert F. Kennedy Jr. at a Trump rally in August 2024, shortly after endorsing him

July and August 2024 saw three of the most high profile endorsements of the Trump campaign. Just after the assassination attempt in Pennsylvania, tech magnate Elon Musk vowed to support the former President. He would become the campaign's biggest donor. As the owner of Twitter, Musk weaponized the platform to circulate right-wing talking points and disinformation, and amplify Republican accounts. In August 2024, Robert F. Kennedy Jr. suspended his independent presidential campaign and endorsed Trump. On the campaign trail, Kennedy's trademark message was "Make America Healthy Again". He and Trump pledged to resolve the chronic disease epidemic by targeting big pharmaceutical companies, ultraprocessed foods, and certain chemical additives to foods. Former Representative Tulsi Gabbard soon followed suit. Having previously contested the Democratic nomination in 2020, she switched allegiance to the Republican Party, citing the Biden administration's foreign policy failures and "abuse of power".

==== Biden's withdrawal ====
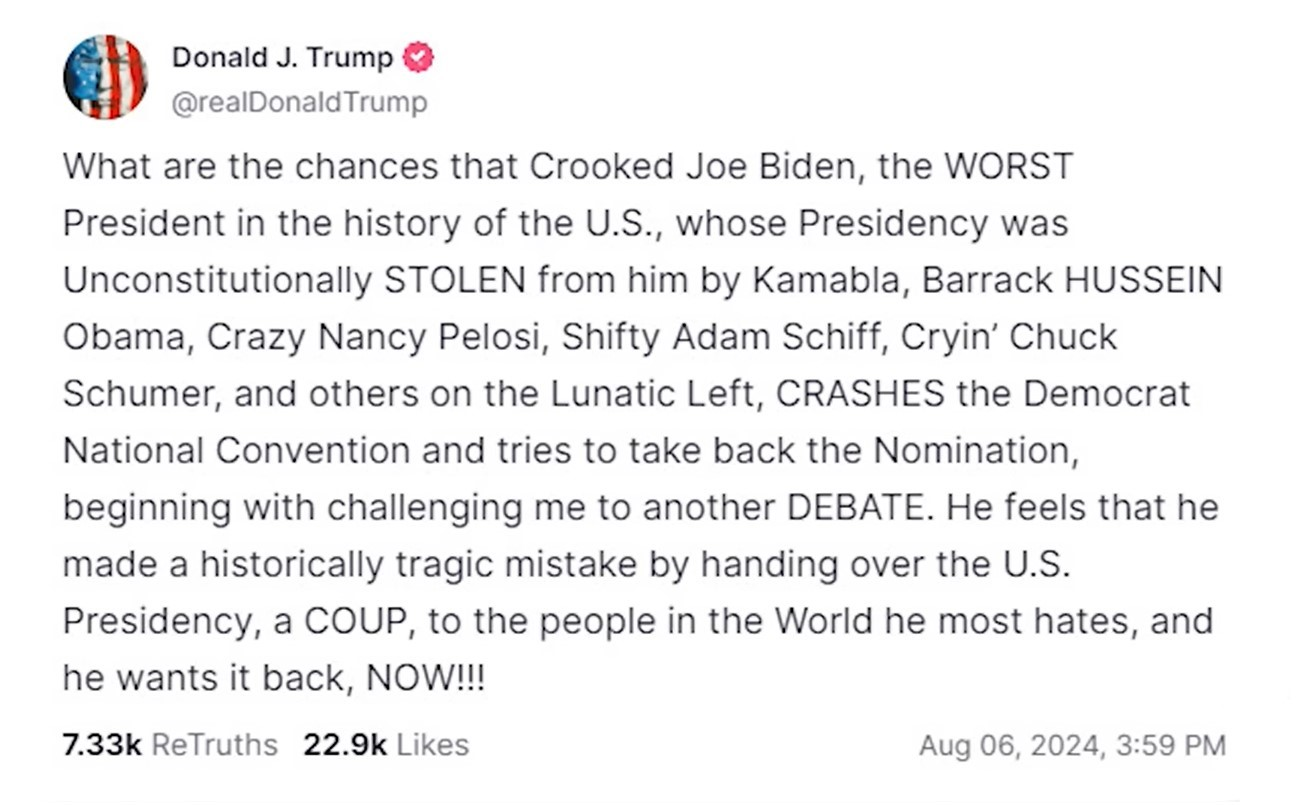
A Trump post on Truth Social lambasting Democrats for launching a "coup" to depose Joe Biden following his withdrawal from the election

On July 21, 2024, following his poor debate performance, Biden ultimately withdrew from the race. He immediately endorsed Harris to replace him in his place as the party's presidential nominee. On August 5, she officially became the Democratic Party's presidential nominee, and Minnesota governor Tim Walz was chosen to be her running mate. Trump criticized Biden's withdrawal and Harris' subsequent accession without a competitive nominating process, calling it a "coup". He and his allies would point out that Harris "got zero votes [in the primaries]". Biden's withdrawal reportedly caused problems within Trump's campaign. In fact, Maggie Haberman and Jonathan Swan of The New York Times characterized the ensuing situation as the campaign's "worst three weeks". This reflected in national polling. By late August, with Harris as a presidential nominee, polls had her beating Trump by multiple points, giving the Democratic Party back their lead they had lost under Biden.

==== Arlington National Cemetery incident ====
During an August 2024 visit at Arlington National Cemetery, Trump's entourage brought in a photographer and videographer to Section 60, to capture promotional content for his campaign. However, such content is not permitted in Section 60. When a cemetery official attempted to stop them, two campaign staffers, Justin Caporale and Michel Picard, pushed and verbally abused him. Later in August, Trump's campaign released a TikTok video of Trump's Section 60 visit, as well as photos of the former President standing next to graves while smiling and giving a thumbs up. Facing criticism, the campaign denied all wrongdoing. In fact, family members accompanying Trump during the visit had accepted to be "respectfully captured". Vance criticized the media and Democratic party for "[making] a scandal out of something where there really is none", adding that "[Harris] wants to yell at Donald Trump because he showed up … She can go to hell." Harris had not yet commented on the incident. The U.S. Army issued a statement rebuking the Trump campaign, followed by a similar one from the Defense Department, the Green Beret Foundation, Iraq and Afghanistan Veterans of America, and VoteVets.org.

==== Foreign interference ====
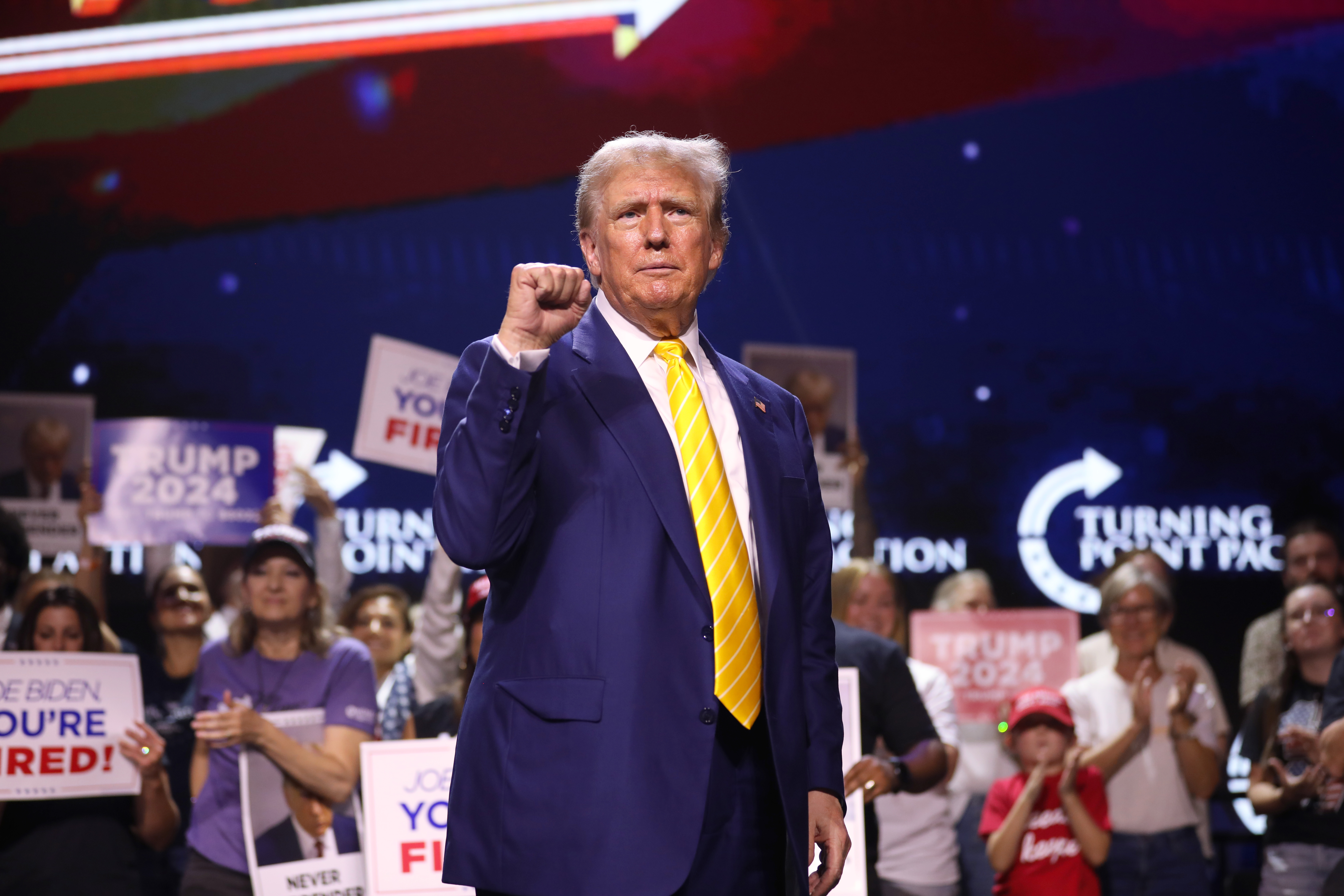
Trump at a Turning Point event in Phoenix, Arizona, in June 2024

China, Iran, and Russia all interfered with Trump's campaign and the broader presidential election with their general aim being to spread disinformation and propaganda and, ultimately, foment distrust in the electoral process and discredit American democracy. Networks of fake social media accounts and websites were deployed. These networks, described by The New York Times as "sophisticated," were state-run and targeted at particular voter demographics. China, through its Spamouflauge influence operation, promoted fabricated content related to divisive political issues, such as that of pro-Palestine protesters. It created fake pro-Trump accounts, but its interference in the election did not necessarily favor any particular candidate. In August 2024, Trump's campaign confirmed that it had been hacked by Iranian operatives. According to a Microsoft report issued the previous day, an Islamic Revolutionary Guard Corps intelligence unit conducted a spear phishing attack. Iran attempted to tip the race in Biden and Harris' favor, even though they too were targeted in disinformation campaigns. Russia disseminated Trump-aligned content, such as a video purporting to show voter fraud in Georgia, to aid the former President's effort. Analysts noted his campaign had taken a softer stance on helping Ukraine in its war with Russia relative to Harris'.

==== Debate with Kamala Harris ====
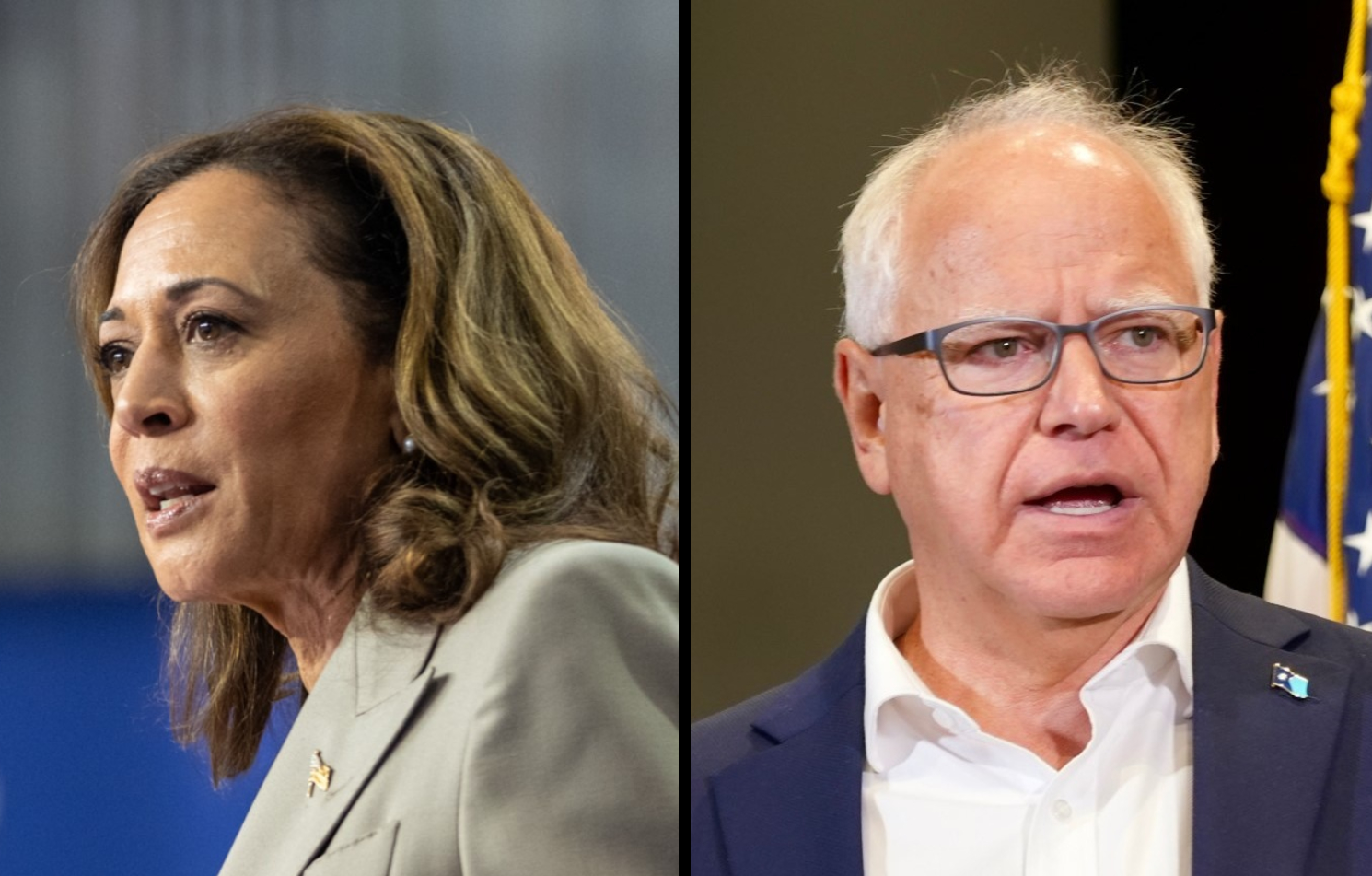
Trump's and Vance's respective opponents following Biden's withdrawal, Democratic nominees Kamala Harris and Tim Walz

On September 10, 2024, Trump debated Harris in the second and final presidential debate of the election season, and the only debate between the two candidates. He had previously been reluctant to attend another debate unless hosted by Fox News, but eventually relented in August. During the debate, Trump made several "extreme" false claims. He alleged that some states allowed post-birth abortions, and that Haitian migrants in Springfield were looting and eating residents' pets. This prompted the debate moderators to fact check him. In response, Trump and his allies criticized these fact checks as "unfair". The Washington Post found Trump made four times as many false or misleading statements than Harris. Subsequent polling overwhelmingly concluded that Trump lost, with Reuters, for instance, finding that only 24% of respondents thought that he won, as opposed to 53% for Harris. Even Fox News writer Doug Schoen considered Harris the "clear winner". Trump's brazenly false statements, constant dwelling on the past, such as his claims of voter fraud in the 2020 election, and overall irascible and uncomfortable demeanor, were the preeminent cited reasons for his loss. Nonetheless, the debate's impact on the race was questionable. Polling numbers for both candidates did not change much following the debate, with Harris acquiring a minor gain. Later on, Trump confirmed that he would not participate in another debate.

==== "Kamala is for they/them" advertisement ====
Trump's "Kamala is for they/them" Advertisement
- View – via Trump's official Instagram account

In late September 2024, Trump's campaign launched a 30-second advertisement excoriating Harris for supporting taxpayer-funded sex changes for prisoners. It features footage of her saying so in a 2019 interview. Notably, it concludes with the narrator declaring, "Kamala is for they/them. President Trump is for you". This was one of several Trump ads painting his opponent as an out-of-touch radical and playing on Americans' general skepticism over transgender rights. It, and its variations, aired over 30,000 times. In retrospect, many commentators considered it one of the most effective ads of the election season. Future Forward, a Democratic Super PAC, found that it shifted the race by 2.7 percentage points after viewers watched it, although other analyses showed mixed results.

==== Appearance on The Joe Rogan Experience ====
In October 2024, Trump appeared on The Joe Rogan Experience (JRE), the most popular podcast in the U.S. The interview covered a wide range of issues, political: the 2020 election, Kim Jong Un, and apolitical: aliens, The Apprentice, et cetera. Trump had already committed much time to podcasts, including Theo Von's and Logan Paul's—to a greater extent than Harris. The JRE appearance helped him appeal to young male voters. Within a day, it had amassed 27 million views on YouTube, more than the opening game of the World Series.

==== Madison Square Garden rally ====
Trump held his last major campaign event at Madison Square Garden, Manhattan, one week before the election. Among its featured speakers were comedian Tony Hinchcliffe, who prominently called Puerto Rico a "floating island of garbage," suggested that Harris had worked as a prostitute, and stated that he and one of his black friends had "carved watermelons" together, as well as Trump's friend David Rem, who referred to Harris as "the Antichrist". The rally was noted for its vicious rhetoric; Democrats tied it to a Nazi rally held at the same venue in 1939. The New York Times labelled Trump's rally as a "Closing Carnival of Grievances, Misogyny and Racism". Hinchcliffe's comments, particularly the "floating island of garbage" remark, proved especially controversial. He responded to Democratic outcry on Twitter, stating they "have no sense of humor" and that he was merely calling out Puerto Rico's landfill problem.

==== McDonald's and garbage truck stunts ====
Video of Trump's shift at McDonald's
- View – via WFAA on YouTube

In the final days of the campaign, Trump staged two stunts. First, in late October, he worked a half-hour staged shift at McDonald's serving fries. This was done as a response to Harris' claimed time working at the fast food chain while in college, which Trump denied. With the stunt, Trump "troll[ed]" her and "cosplay[ed] as a minimum wage worker". Writing for The Spectator, Juan P. Villasmil remarked that the visit managed to cast doubt on his opponent's working-class appeal. On the other hand, Jonathan Cohn in a New Republic podcast considered it "almost too casual, it’s a bit insulting". A few days later, Trump, dressed in a bright orange vest, rode on a personalized garbage truck. This too served to counter a Democratic opponent's statement, namely, Biden calling Trump's supporters "garbage." He subsequently held a rally donning the vest.

==== Final rally ====
Trump held his final campaign rally at Grand Rapids, Michigan, on the day before the election. At this point, he and Harris were roughly even in the polls, with the gap between the two candidates produced in the aftermath of Biden's withdrawal having significantly narrowed. It was to close off nine years of political campaigning.

== Aftermath ==
Electoral college results of the 2024 presidential election; Trump won a majority of 312 votes

Donald Trump's campaign was successful. He won the 2024 presidential election with 312 electoral votes and 49.8% of the popular vote. He carried 31 states out of 50, including all seven swing states. One of them, Nevada, had last gone to the Republican presidential candidate in 2004. Trump's victory was "decisive"; he was the first Republican since George W. Bush in 2004 to win the national popular vote (unlike his 2016 victory and his 2020 defeat), as well as the first non-incumbent Republican since George H. W. Bush in 1988 to do so. All 50 states, including Washington D.C., shifted to the Republican Party, for the first time since 1976 in which the popular vote margin in all 50 states and Washington D.C. swung in the same direction from the previous election. However, Trump's triumph was not a landslide. He only won a plurality of the popular vote, with his 49.8% total being one of the slimmest of a winning candidate in American history.

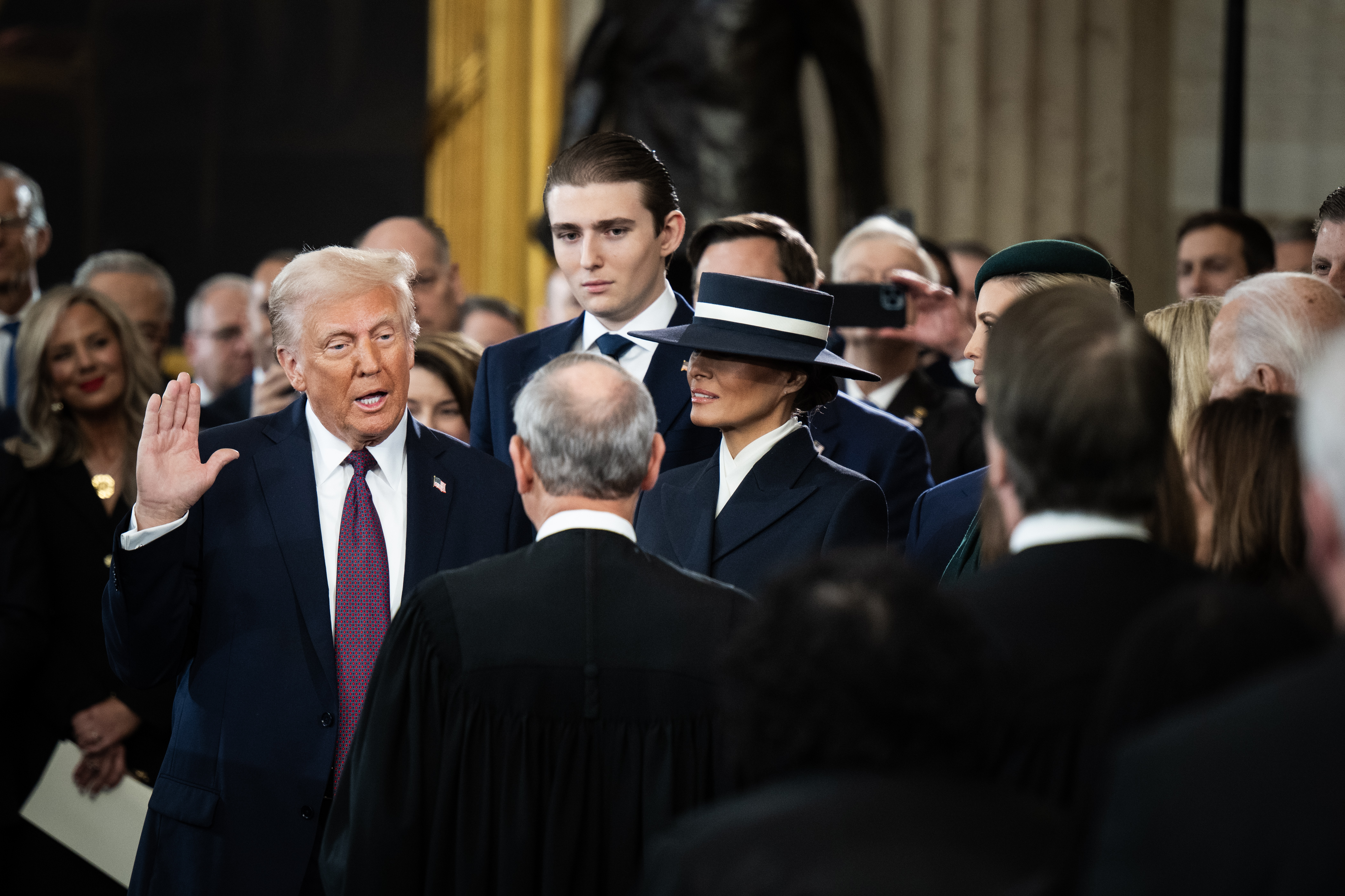
Trump being inaugurated on January 20, 2025, as the 47th president of the United States

Trump became the second president to be reelected to a non-consecutive term, after Grover Cleveland in 1892. Aged 78 on election day, he remains the oldest candidate ever elected to the presidency. JD Vance became the first Ohio native to be elected to the vice presidency since Charles Dawes in 1924 and the first veteran since Al Gore in 1992. Trump was inaugurated on January 20, 2025 as the 47th president of the United States, and Vance, as the 50th vice president of the United States.

== See also ==
- Kamala Harris 2024 presidential campaign
- Joe Biden 2024 presidential campaign
- Donald Trump 2000 presidential campaign
- Donald Trump 2016 presidential campaign
- Donald Trump 2020 presidential campaign
