= Alex Latcham =

American political operative (born 1992)

- Born: Alexander Stephan Latcham; April 30, 1992 (age 34); Ohio, U.S.
- Education: Drake University (BA)

Alexander Stephan Latcham (born April 30, 1992) is an American political operative and Republican strategist. He currently serves as executive director of the Senate Leadership Fund.

== Early life and education (1992–2014) ==
Alexander Stephan Latcham was born on April 30, 1992, in Ohio. Latcham attended Drake University; while a student, he worked for Sarah Palin and later Michele Bachmann in her 2012 presidential campaign, as well as Mitt Romney in his presidential campaign. He graduated with a bachelor's degree in political science.

== Career ==
Latcham worked for the Republican Party of Iowa but later became Donald Trump's political director for the state. He returned to his role after the 2016 presidential election. He served as special assistant to the president and deputy political director in the Trump administration. In August 2021, Save America hired Latcham as a consultant. In February 2023, he became the early states director for Trump's 2024 campaign.

In November 2024, Trump named Latcham as deputy assistant to the president and director of the Office of Public Liaison. He was named as executive director of the Senate Leadership Fund in January 2025.

== Works cited ==
=== Articles ===
- Bade, Rachael; Daniels, Eugene; Lizza, Ryan (February 21, 2023). "2024 hopefuls rev their engines". Politico.
- Flynn, Meagan (February 1, 2012). "Student shares experience with politics in Iowa". The Times-Delphic.
- Gabriel, Trip (March 18, 2023). "For Trump and His Potential 2024 G.O.P. Rivals, It's All About Iowa". The New York Times.
- Kight, Stef (January 8, 2025). "Alex Latcham joins Cory Gardner to run Senate Leadership Fund". Axios.
- Payne, Marissa (November 26, 2024). "Iowa political operative Alex Latcham tapped to serve in Trump administration". The Des Moines Register.
- Pfannenstiel, Brianne (December 5, 2015). "How are candidates spending ahead of the Iowa caucuses?". The Des Moines Register.
- Pfannenstiel, Brianne (December 23, 2016). "Which Iowans might Trump tap for his administration?". The Des Moines Register.
- Pfannenstiel, Brianne (August 12, 2021). "Donald Trump's leadership PAC hires two Iowa GOP political consultants". The Des Moines Register.

=== Documents ===
- "Alexander Stephan Latcham in the Ohio, U.S., Birth Index, 1908-2003" (Document). Birth Index.
