= Senate Leadership Fund =

United States political action committee

- Abbreviation: SLF
- Formation: 2015; 11 years ago
- Type: Independent expenditure-only political committee (Super PAC)
- Registration no.: C00571703
- Location: Washington, D.C., U.S.
- Executive Director: Alex Latcham
- Treasurer: Caleb Crosby
- Website: senateleadershipfund.org

The Senate Leadership Fund (SLF PAC) is an American Republican-aligned super PAC that works to secure and maintain Republican control of the United States Senate. Founded in January 2015 by allies of Senate majority leader Mitch McConnell, it later became the principal super PAC aligned with Republican Senate leadership.

The Senate Leadership Fund is closely affiliated with One Nation, a 501(c)(4) nonprofit organization that is not legally required to publicly disclose its donors. However, as a super PAC, the SLF must disclose the individuals and organizations that donate to it directly. One Nation has transferred tens of millions of dollars to SLF, allowing some of the original sources of the money ultimately spent by the super PAC to remain undisclosed. This arrangement has been described as a form of dark money, as the original sources of funds used for political spending are not publicly disclosed.

In the 2024 election cycle alone, it spent approximately $211 million in independent expenditures, which is the third highest amount among super PACs, and $296.6 million overall. It has focused on competitive Senate elections, frequently launching advertisements opposing Democratic candidates.

== Activities ==
=== Georgia, 2020 ===
The PAC registered Peachtree PAC in 2020 and spent over $35 million between November 6, 2020, and December 31, 2020. Peachtree spent $12,417,180.41 opposing Jon Ossoff and $12,417,180.41 opposing Raphael Warnock along with $6,505,575.64 supporting Kelly Loeffler and $6,505,575.64 supporting David Perdue. A spokesperson for the PAC declined to say who was funding Peachtree.

=== 2024 ===
2024 spending
Spending ($)	Support/Oppose	Candidate	Candidate Won	Race
63,683,899.22	oppose	Sherrod Brown	No	Ohio Senator
52,799,239.86	oppose	Bob Casey Jr.	No	Pennsylvania Senator
32,331,391.30	oppose	Elissa Slotkin	Yes	Michigan Senator
23,065,091.98	oppose	Jon Tester	No	Montana Senator
22,329,701.41	oppose	Tammy Baldwin	Yes	Wisconsin Senator
6,938,926.82	support	Bernie Moreno	Yes	Ohio Senator
3,187,411.00	oppose	Dan Osborn	No	Nebraska Senator
3,016,401.95	oppose	Jacky Rosen	Yes	Nevada Senator
3,012,401.95	support	Sam Brown	No	Nevada Senator
498,473.00	support	Donald Trump	Yes	United States President
230,094.39	support	Tim Sheehy	Yes	Montana Senator

== 2026 Election Cycle ==
=== Spending Plan ===
In April 2026, SLF unveiled a plan to spend approximately $350 million across an eight-state Senate battleground, with advertising set to begin airing in early September. Alex Latcham, the organization's executive director, outlined $300 million in planned new spending across seven states that fall, comprising $271 million for television, digital, and streaming advertising, with the remainder directed toward mail and get-out-the-vote operations. A separate $42 million commitment for Maine had been announced in January.

Of the total allocation, $236 million was directed toward defending five Republican-held seats, with the remaining $106 million targeting three Democratic-held seats. Politico and Punchbowl News both characterized the scale of the reservations as evidence of a defensive posture for Senate Republicans heading into the midterms.

=== State Allocations ===
The largest single commitment was $79 million designated for Ohio, where Republican Senator Jon Husted faces a challenge from former Senator Sherrod Brown, who lost his 2024 re-election bid.

North Carolina received the second-largest allocation at $71 million, supporting former Republican National Committee Chairman Michael Whatley against former Governor Roy Cooper in the race for the state's open seat.

SLF committed $45 million to Michigan's open Senate seat in support of Republican nominee Mike Rogers, a former U.S. Representative. In Georgia, the organization allocated $44 million toward defeating incumbent Democratic Senator Jon Ossoff.

In Iowa, SLF designated $29 million for the state's open Senate race. The organization allocated $17 million to New Hampshire, where party leaders were backing former Senator John E. Sununu in the Republican primary against former Senator Scott Brown. In Alaska, SLF committed $15 million to defend incumbent Republican Senator Dan Sullivan against former Representative Mary Peltola, noting that outside spending against Peltola in 2024 had contributed to her loss by a wide margin.

==== Donors over $1 million (January 2023 - December 2024) ====
- $35.58 from One Nation (United States)
- $30 million from Kenneth C. Griffin
- $27 million from Paul Singer (businessman)
- $15 million from Miriam Adelson
- $10 million from Elon Musk
- $10 million between Pat Ryan (executive) and Shirley Ryan
- $9 million between J. Christopher Reyes and Jude Reyes
- $9 million from Stephen A. Schwarzman
- $6 million between Charles R. Schwab and Hellen O. Schwab
- $5.5 million from Warren Stephens
- $4.5 from Chevron Corporation
- $4 million from Occidental Petroleum Corp
- $3.875 from Altria
- $3.5 million from the American Petroleum Institute
- 2.5 million between Koch, Inc. and Koch Industries Inc.
- $2 million from Kenneth Fisher
- $2 million from Rupert Murdoch
- $2 million from Jim Walton
- $2 million from Rob Walton
- $1.75 million from Jim Davis (businessman)
- $1.75 million from Marc Rowan
- $1.1 million from Trevor Rees-Jones
- $1 million from The Anschutz Corporation
- $1 million from Ron Cameron (businessman)
- $1 million from Ken Langone
- $1 million from Elizabeth Uihlein
- $1 million from the U.S. Chamber of Commerce
- $1 million from Jeff Yass

== See also ==
- Congressional Leadership Fund
