= Tory Gavito =

American activist and attorney

Victoria "Tory" Gavito is an American activist. As an attorney, Gavito has represented unions, immigrant and migrant workers, and individuals regarding a variety of labor law, wage payment and employment discrimination matters.

Gavito is the co-founder and president of Way to Win, the founding executive director of the Texas Future Project, and founder of the Texas Future Project Research Center.

== Career ==
Gavito received a BA in political science and Spanish from St. Olaf College in 2000. She graduated from St. Mary's University School of Law in 2004.

From 2004 to 2006, Gavito received the New Voice Fellowship and the Yale Initiative for Public Interest Law Grant to work as a Staff Attorney at the Central Texas Immigrant Workers’ Rights Center, a wage claim project affiliated with the Austin, Texas Equal Justice Center. There she supervised law students in the Transnational Workers’ Rights Clinic at the University of Texas School of Law, and led a wage-claim litigation project for low-wage immigrant workers in contract and labor disputes. The project resulted in the creation of the Austin, Texas Workers’ Defense Project (WDP), a membership organization for low-wage workers.

In 2018, Gavito co-founded Way to Win, and currently serves as its president. Way to Win is a progressive electoral organization that backs candidates.

Gavito is currently an advisory board member of the Center for Migrant Rights and the Workers Defense Project. Gavito is also on the board of the State Innovation Exchange-Action.

Gavito also served as a research assistant at the Immigration Human Rights Clinic at the Center for Legal and Social Justice at St. Mary's Law School, and as an AmeriCorps Volunteer with the American Friends Service Committee in Denver, Colorado.
