= Project 2025 =

Conservative political initiative in the United States

- Established: April 21, 2023; 3 years ago
- Services: Recruitment and training of government workers loyal to Donald Trump
- Director: Paul Dans (until August 2024)
- President: Kevin Roberts
- Publication: Mandate for Leadership: The Conservative Promise (2023)
- Parent organization: The Heritage Foundation
- Budget: $22 million
- Website: www.project2025.org

Project 2025 (also known as the 2025 Presidential Transition Project) is a political initiative published in April 2023 by the Heritage Foundation with the goal of reshaping the U.S. federal government by consolidating executive power in favor of right-wing policies. It constitutes a policy document that suggests specific changes to the federal government, a personnel database for recommending vetting loyal staff in the federal government, and a set of proposed executive orders for the U.S. president to implement those policies.

The project's policy document Mandate for Leadership calls for the replacement of federal civil service workers by people loyal to "the next conservative president" and for taking partisan control of the Department of Justice (DOJ), the Federal Bureau of Investigation (FBI), the Department of Commerce (DOC), and the Federal Trade Commission (FTC). Other agencies, including the Department of Homeland Security (DHS) and the Department of Education (ED), would be dismantled. It calls for reducing environmental regulations and realigning the National Institutes of Health (NIH) with conservative priorities. The blueprint seeks to reduce taxes on corporations, institute a flat income tax on individuals, cut Medicare and Medicaid, and reverse as many of President Joe Biden's policies as possible. It proposes banning pornography, removing legal protections against anti-LGBT discrimination, and ending diversity, equity, and inclusion (DEI) programs while having the DOJ prosecute anti-white racism. The project recommends mass deportation of illegal immigrants. The plan also proposes enacting laws supported by the Christian right, such as criminalizing the sending and receiving of abortion and birth control medications and eliminating coverage of emergency contraception.

Project 2025 is based on a controversial interpretation of unitary executive theory according to which the executive branch is under the president's complete control. Analysts note that the approach would further reduce agency independence and centralize presidential control. PBS News Hour reporting has linked these ambitions to discussions of domestic military involvement, pointing to Trump's deployment of the National Guard to Washington, D.C., as a potential precedent. The project's proponents say it would dismantle a bureaucracy they say is unaccountable and mostly liberal. Critics have called it an authoritarian, Christian nationalist plan that would steer the U.S. toward autocracy. Some legal experts say it would undermine the rule of law, separation of powers, separation of church and state, and civil liberties.

Most of Project 2025's contributors worked in either Trump's first administration (2017−2021) or his campaign for the 2024 presidential election. (Note: 31 of 38 (81%) contributors held positions within Trump's administration or transition team.) Several Trump campaign officials maintained contact with Project 2025, seeing its goals as aligned with their Agenda 47 program. Trump later attempted to distance himself from the plan. (Note: Trump called some of its proposals "ridiculous and abysmal". Critics dismissed Trump's denials due to the plan's involvement of close allies, his 2022 endorsement of the Heritage Foundation's plans, and the 300 times Trump is mentioned in them.) After he won the 2024 election, he nominated several of the plan's creators and supporters to positions in his second administration. Four days into his second term, analysis by Time found that nearly two-thirds of Trump's executive actions "mirror or partially mirror" proposals from Project 2025.

== Background ==
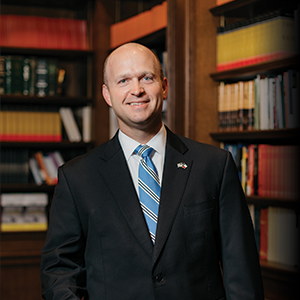
Kevin Roberts, president of the Heritage Foundation, established Project 2025 with the goal of "building a governing agenda, not just for next January but long into the future".

The Heritage Foundation, a conservative think tank founded in 1973, has had significant influence in U.S. public policy making. In 2019, it ranked among the most influential public policy organizations in the United States. It coordinates with many conservative groups to build a network of allies.

The Heritage Foundation is closely aligned with Trump. The project's president, Kevin Roberts, sees the organization's current role as "institutionalizing Trumpism". At a 2022 Heritage Foundation dinner, Trump endorsed the organization, saying it was "going to lay the groundwork and detail plans for exactly what our movement will do ... when the American people give us a colossal mandate." Roberts said in April 2024 that he had talked to Trump about Project 2025; the Trump campaign denied this.

Vice President JD Vance wrote the foreword to Roberts's book Dawn's Early Light: Taking Back Washington to Save America. Some have claimed that Vance is connected to Project 2025 through shared views on policy matters.

Project 2025 was established in 2022 with Paul Dans as director to provide the 2024 Republican presidential nominee with a personnel database and ideological framework. According to the Johnson Amendment, 501(c)(3) organizations like Heritage cannot explicitly promote a particular election candidate. The Heritage Foundation spent $22 million preparing staffing recommendations for a conservative government in 2025. This was much more than what the group typically does for its staffing recommendations because President Trump said he had terrible staff during his first term. Citing the Reagan-era maxim that "personnel is policy", some political commentators have argued that personnel is the most important aspect of Project 2025.

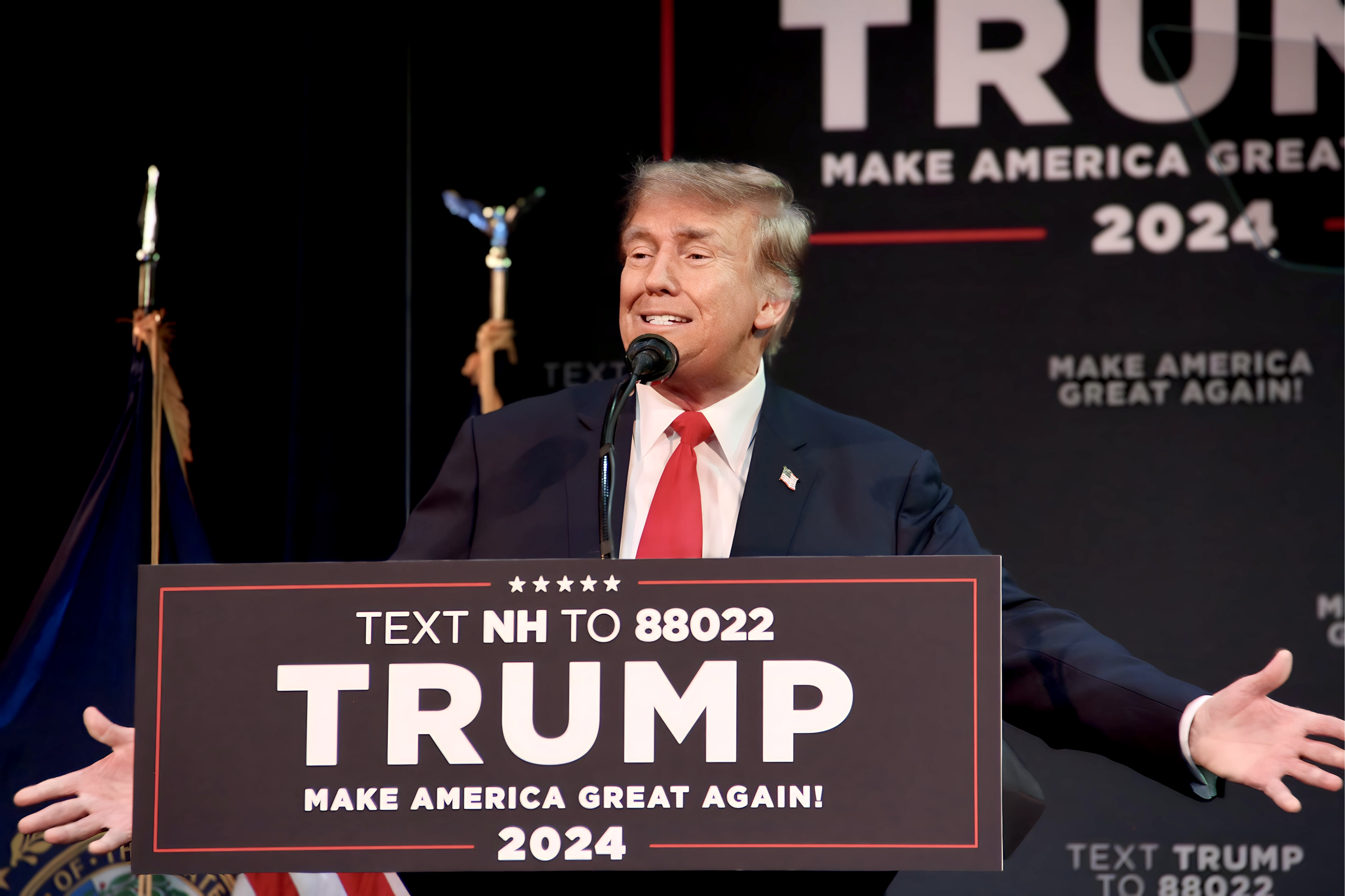
Many contributors of the Project have close ties to Donald Trump and his 2024 presidential campaign. (Note: Skibell (2024): Many of the authors of the blueprint are former Trump officials, and the Heritage Foundation has spent the past year-plus recruiting people to implement the plans within the administration, Scott said. "So they don't just have a long, sprawling policy document," he said, "they also have a growing list of staff who are being tested to see if they are loyal to Trump and if they are willing to administer this in his potential administration." — Scott Waldman Klawans (2024): Former Trump staffers involved with Project 2025 include former White House chief of staff Mark Meadows and Trump's former senior adviser Stephen Miller, the latter of whom has been described as a white nationalist. However, as New York magazine said, many of Trump's indicated plans for a second term fall in line with the Project 2025 outline. — Justin Klawans Mascaro (2024b): While the Trump campaign has repeatedly said that outside groups do not speak for the former president, Project 2025's 1,000-page proposal was drafted with input from a long list of former Trump administration officials who are poised to fill the top ranks of a potential new administration.)

The Mandate for Leadership series has had new volumes released in parallel with United States presidential elections since 1981. Heritage calls its Mandate a "policy bible", claiming that the implementation of almost two-thirds of the policies in its 1981 Mandate was attempted by Ronald Reagan, and similarly, the implementation of nearly two-thirds of the policies of its 2015 Mandate was attempted by Trump.

In April 2023, the Heritage Foundation published the 920-page Mandate, written by hundreds of conservatives. Nearly half of the project's collaborating organizations have received dark money contributions from a network of fundraising groups linked to Leonard Leo, a major conservative donor and key figure in guiding the selection of Trump's federal judicial nominees. Some of the authors worked for Amazon, Meta, and bitcoin companies directly or as lobbyists. One expert claimed inconsistencies in the plan are designed for fund-raising from certain industries or donors that would benefit.

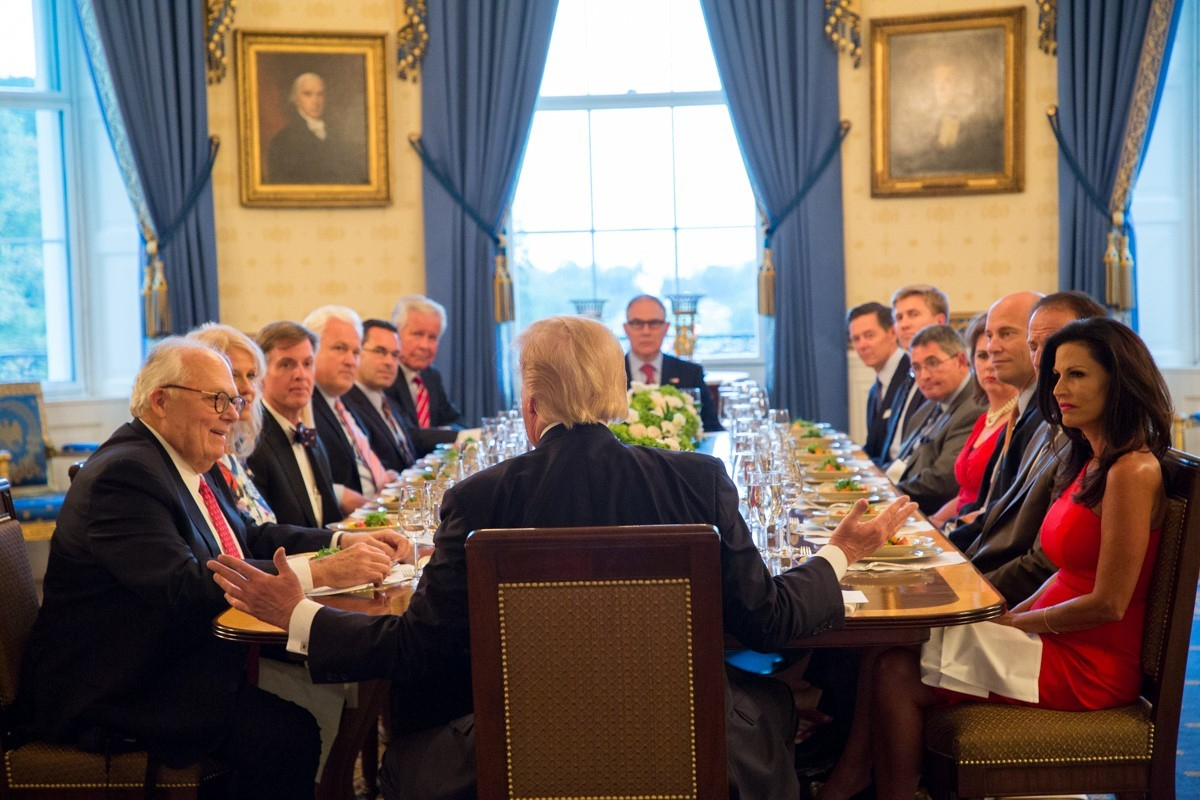
President Trump meeting with Edwin Feulner (left front) co-founder of the Heritage Foundation, and other conservative group leaders in 2017

The 2024 Trump campaign said no outside group speaks for Trump and that Agenda 47 is the only official plan for a second Trump presidency. Policy suggestions from groups in Project 2025 reflected Trump's own words. His campaign said it appreciated these groups' policy suggestions. On July 5, 2024, Trump denied any knowledge of Project 2025. Political commentators including Robert Reich, Michael Steele, and Olivia Troye dismissed Trump's denial.

Heritage briefed other Republican candidates on the project, but focused on policies Trump could implement.

Project 2025 is not the only conservative program with a database of prospective recruits for a potential Republican administration, though these initiatives' leaders all have connections to Trump. In general, these initiatives seek to help Trump avoid the mistakes of his first term, when he arrived at the White House unprepared. By reclassifying tens of thousands of merit-based federal civil service workers as political appointees in order to replace them with Trump loyalists, some fear they would be willing to bend or break protocol, or in some cases violate laws, to achieve his goals.

== Advisory board and leadership ==
=== Partner network ===
By February 2024, Project 2025 had over 100 partner organizations. The Southern Poverty Law Center identified seven of these as hate or extremist groups.

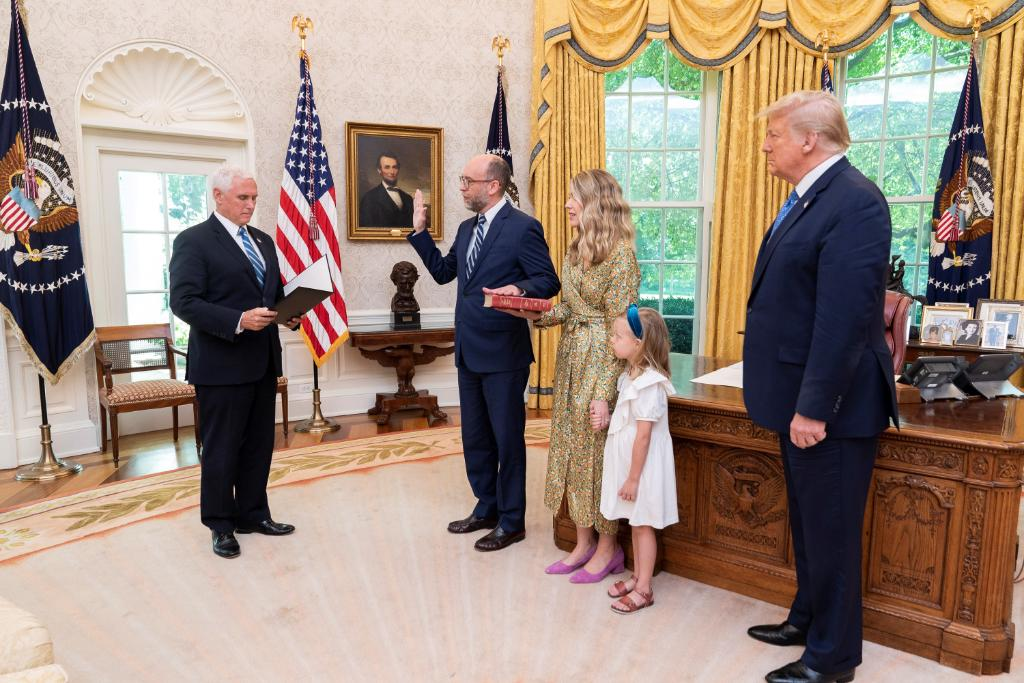
Vought being sworn in as OMB Director in July 2020

In May 2024, Russell Vought was named policy director of the Republican National Committee platform committee. The Center for Renewing America (CRA), founded by Vought, is on Project 2025's advisory board. CRA drafted executive orders, regulations, and memos that could have laid the groundwork for rapid action on Trump's plans when he won. The CRA identified Christian Nationalism as one of the top priorities for the second Trump term. Vought claimed that Trump blessed the CRA, and that his effort to distance himself from Project 2025 was just politics. Vought was Trump's director of the Office of Management and Budget during his first term and was reappointed to the position for the second term.

In July 2024, Stephen Miller, a former Trump advisor, sought to remove his organization, America First Legal, from the Project 2025 list of advisory board members. Before leaving Project 2025, he appeared in a promotional video for it. In November 2024, he was appointed as an advisor to the White House for Trump's second term.

=== Connections to Trump ===
Project 2025 partners employ over 200 former Trump administration officials. Trump was not personally involved in drafting or approving the plan. Six of his cabinet secretaries are authors or contributors to the 2025 Mandate, and about 20 pages are credited to his first deputy chief of staff. By summer 2023, the project was seen as a fitting organization for Trump's young and loyal advisors.

On July 5, 2024, Project 2025 released a statement saying the project "does not speak for any candidate or campaign" and that it is up to "the next conservative president" to decide which of its recommendations to implement. Also in July, Trump reiterated his disavowal of Project 2025, but in the same month Project 2025 Director Paul Dans confirmed that his team had ongoing connections with Trump's campaign.

John McEntee, a senior advisor for Project 2025 and former Trump aide, said the project was doing valuable work in anticipation of Trump's second term. Christopher Miller, who was secretary of defense for the last month of Trump's first term, wrote the Mandate's chapter on the Department of Defense. Associate project director Spencer Chretien served as associate director of presidential personnel during Trump's first term. He said it was "past time to lay the groundwork for a White House more friendly to the right".

Before Trump's second term, many contributors to Project 2025 were expected to take positions in his second administration and the administration was expected to use the database of potential federal employees the project recruited and trained. Peter Navarro, one of Mandate's authors, was appointed Senior Counselor for Trade and Manufacturing.

=== Leaders ===
On July 2, 2024, Heritage Foundation president Kevin Roberts created controversy by saying, "we are in the process of the second American Revolution, which will remain bloodless if the left allows it to be." Shortly afterward, the Foundation released a statement adding, "Unfortunately, they have a well established record of instigating the opposite."

During the week of July 29, Dans told Project staff that he would step down as director in August to focus on the election campaign. Kevin Roberts assumed leadership of the project. Roger Severino is vice president of domestic policy at the Heritage Foundation. He, Roberts, and Dans wrote much of the Mandate.

== Philosophical outlook ==
The main Project 2025 document, published April 21, 2023

The Mandate for Leadership outlines four main aims: restoring the family as the centerpiece of American life; dismantling the administrative state; defending the nation's sovereignty and borders; and securing God-given individual rights to live freely. Roberts writes in the Mandate's foreword: "The long march of cultural Marxism through our institutions has come to pass. The federal government is a behemoth, weaponized against American citizens and conservative values, with freedom and liberty under siege as never before."

Roberts interprets the phrase "pursuit of happiness" in the Declaration of Independence as "pursuit of blessedness". According to him, "an individual must be free to live as his Creator ordained—to flourish." The Constitution, he argues, "grants each of us the liberty to do not what we want, but what we ought". He highlights family, religious devotion and spirituality, work, and community as contributing to "a good life". Project 2025 plans to infuse every aspect of the federal government with Christian nationalism. Roberts writes that the U.S. in 2024 is a place where "inflation is ravaging family budgets, drug overdose deaths continue to escalate, and children suffer the toxic normalization of transgenderism with drag queens and pornography invading their school libraries". Roberts also expressed concern over crime in the U.S.

Dans, also an editor of the project's guiding document, described Project 2025 as preparing a staff of conservatives to fight the deep state with their training from partner organizations. He wrote that Project 2025 has four pillars:

1. The Mandate for Leadership.
2. A personnel database, open to submissions from the public that Heritage can share with Trump's team.
3. The Presidential Administration Academy, an online educational system.
4. A secret playbook for creating teams and plans to activate after inauguration.

== Policies ==
Project 2025's supporters say it will dismantle a government bureaucracy that they say is unaccountable and biased toward liberalism. Its critics have called it authoritarian, Christian nationalist, and autocratic. Legal experts say it would undermine the rule of law, the separation of powers, the separation of church and state, and civil liberties.

Some critics have suggested Project 2025 is based on personal vengeance, or that its proposals for national conservatism are merely an "attempt to intellectually retrofit a rationale for Trumpism". Compared to previous Republican agendas, Project 2025 contains more elements of culture war and advocates wider implementation of policy across the federal government. Some Project 2025 proposals may require Congressional approval or favorable Supreme Court rulings, but many others appear designed for implementation through executive orders or regulatory action—a pattern noted in independent analyses of executive orders and regulatory initiatives aligned with the project.

=== Economy ===
Project 2025 provides a range of options for economic reform that vary in their degree of radicalism. It is critical of the Federal Reserve, which it blames for the business cycle, and proposes its gradual abolition; it advocates instead that the dollar be backed by a commodity like gold. It recommends eliminating full employment from the Federal Reserve's mandate, instead focusing solely on targeting inflation.

The project envisions eventually moving from an income tax to a consumption tax, such as a national sales tax. In the interim, the project seeks to extend the Tax Cuts and Jobs Act of 2017 (TCJA). It further recommends simplifying individual income taxes to two flat tax rates: 15% on incomes up to the Social Security Wage Base ($168,600 in 2024), and 30% above that. An unspecified standard deduction would be included, but most deductions, credits and exclusions would be eliminated. The proposal would likely increase taxes significantly for millions of low- and middle-income households.

It aims to reduce the corporate tax rate from 21% to 18% because the mandate authors see it as the most harmful tax. The 2017 TCJA cut the rate from 35% to 21%. It proposes reducing the capital gains rate for high earners to 15% from the 2024 level of 20%. After these reforms are implemented, it recommends that a three-fifths vote threshold be required to pass legislation that increases individual or corporate income tax. The constitutionality of such "legislative entrenchment" is debated, but most legal scholars agree it is not allowed.

The project proposes merging the Bureau of Economic Analysis, the Census Bureau, and the Bureau of Labor Statistics into a single organization, and aligning its mission with conservative principles. It recommends maximizing the hiring of political appointees in statistical analysis positions. It also recommends that Congress abolish the Consumer Financial Protection Bureau. It plans to abolish the FTC, which is responsible for enforcing antitrust laws, and shrink the role of the National Labor Relations Board, which protects employees' ability to organize and fight unfair labor practices.

Project 2025 suggests abolishing the Economic Development Administration (EDA) at the Department of Commerce, and, if that proves impossible, having the EDA instead assist "rural communities destroyed by the Biden administration's attack on domestic energy production". Project 2025 also seeks to facilitate innovations in the civilian nuclear industry.

The project declares that "God ordained the Sabbath as a day of rest" and recommends legislation requiring that Americans be paid more for working on Sunday. It also aims to institute work requirements for people reliant on the Supplemental Nutrition Assistance Program, which issues food stamps. It recommends that the Occupational Safety and Health Administration be more lenient on small businesses and that the overtime exception threshold be kept low enough not to burden businesses in rural areas.

Project 2025 is split on the issue of foreign trade. Mandate author Peter Navarro advocates what he calls a "fair trade" policy of reciprocal, higher tariffs on the European Union, China, and India, to achieve a balance of trade, though not all U.S. levies are lower than those of its major trading partners. On the other hand, Mandate author Kent Lassman of the Competitive Enterprise Institute promotes a free trade policy of lowering or eliminating tariffs to cut costs for consumers, and calls for more free trade agreements. He argues that Trump's and Biden's tariffs have undermined not just the American economy, but also the nation's international alliances.

Regarding banking regulation, Mandate recommends combining the Office of the Comptroller of the Currency, the Federal Deposit Insurance Corporation, the National Credit Union Administration, and parts of the Federal Reserve that perform regulatory and fiscal supervision. The document says deposit insurance undermines bank depositors' incentive to monitor their banks' balance sheet. Another goal is to ban the US deployment of a Central bank digital currency in favor of USD-backed but privately managed Stablecoins.

=== Education and research ===
A major concern of Project 2025 is what it calls "woke propaganda" in public schools. In response, it envisions a significant reduction of the federal government's role in education, and the elevation of school choice and parental rights. To achieve that goal, it proposes closing the Department of Education, and giving states control over education funding and policy. Programs under the Individuals with Disabilities Education Act (IDEA) would be administered instead by the Department of Health and Human Services. The National Center for Education Statistics (NCES) would become part of the Census Bureau.

The federal government, according to Project 2025, should be no more than a statistics-keeping organization when it comes to education. Federal enforcement of civil rights in schools should be significantly curtailed, and such responsibilities should be transferred to the Department of Justice, which would then be able to enforce the law only through litigation. The federal government should no longer investigate schools for signs of disparate impacts of disciplinary measures on the basis of race or ethnicity. Project 2025 blames federal government overreach for schools prioritizing "racial parity in school discipline indicators—such as detentions, suspensions, and expulsions—over student safety".

Project 2025 further advocates that Title I of the Elementary and Secondary Education Act of 1965 be allowed to expire, removing $18 billion in federal funds for schools in low-income areas. Public funds for education should be available as school vouchers with no strings attached, even for parents sending their children to private or religious schools. Cuts should be made to the funding for free school meals. The Head Start program that provides services to children of low-income families should be ended. Roger Severino claimed the program does not provide value, but never provided evidence for his claims. For the project's backers, education is a private rather than a public good. Project 2025 criticizes any programs to forgive student loans.

Project 2025 encourages the president to ensure that "any research conducted with taxpayer dollars serves the national interest in a concrete way in line with conservative principles". For example, research in climatology should receive considerably less funding, in line with Project 2025's views on climate change.

Project 2025 hopes to influence Congress to create legislation that would rescind the Biden administration's Title IX policies and restore the first Trump administration's Title IX regulations. Additionally, it seeks to change the definition of sex under Title IX to mean only biological sex recognized at birth.

=== Environment and climate ===
Mandate's climate section was written by several people, including Mandy Gunasekara, whom Trump previously chose as the EPA's chief of staff, and Bernard McNamee, whom Trump appointed to the Federal Energy Regulatory Commission. Four of the report's top authors have publicly engaged in climate change denial. McNamee dismisses climate change mitigation as progressive policy. Gunasekara acknowledges the reality of human-made climate change but considers it politicized and overstated. She claimed to have been an instrumental advocate for the United States withdrawal from the Paris Agreement in 2017. On the other hand, project director Paul Dans accepts only that climate change is real, not that human activity causes it.

The manifesto advises the president to go further than merely nullifying Biden's executive orders on climate change, to "eradicate climate change references from absolutely everywhere". It proposes abandoning strategies for reducing greenhouse gas emissions responsible for climate change, including by repealing regulations that curb emissions, and abolishing the National Oceanic and Atmospheric Administration (NOAA), which the project calls "one of the main drivers of the climate change alarm industry". One scientific expert said these policies would endanger lives, are shooting the messenger, and serve the climate change denial movement.

The Inflation Reduction Act increased the Department of Energy's Loan Programs Office's loan budget from $40 billion to $400 billion. Project 2025 supports repealing the Inflation Reduction Act and closing the Loan Programs Office. McNamee advocates that the DOE reorient funding at the national labs it sponsors from climate change and renewable energy research to making energy more affordable. He advocates entrenching these changes by closing the DOE's Office of Energy Efficiency and Renewable Energy and Office of Clean Energy Demonstrations.

Project 2025 advocates downsizing the EPA. In particular, it seeks to close the EPA's Office of Environmental Justice and External Civil Rights. Heritage Foundation energy and climate director Diana Furchtgott-Roth has suggested that the EPA support the consumption of more natural gas, despite climatologists' concern that this would increase leaks of methane (CH_{4}), a greenhouse gas more potent than carbon dioxide (CO_{2}) in the short term. Project 2025 wants to reverse a 2009 EPA finding that carbon dioxide emissions are harmful to human health, preventing the federal government from regulating greenhouse gas emissions. It also advocates preventing the EPA from using private health data to determine the effects of pollution. Under its blueprint, the expansion of the national electrical grid would be blocked, the transition to renewable energy stymied, and funding for the DOE's Grid Deployment Office curtailed. Nonpartisan experts said renewable energy projects will have to slow down if the electrical grid is not expanded.

The project further advocates that states be prevented from adopting stricter regulations on vehicular emissions, as the state of California has, and that regulations on the fossil fuel industry be relaxed. For example, restrictions on oil drilling imposed by the Bureau of Land Management could be removed.

Project 2025's manifesto includes eliminating climate change mitigation from the National Security Council's agenda and encouraging allied nations to use fossil fuels. It declares that the federal government has an "obligation to develop vast oil and gas and coal resources" and supports Arctic drilling.

Project 2025 recommends incentives for members of the general public "to identify scientific flaws and research misconduct" and to legally challenge climatology research.

Republican climate advocates have disagreed with Project 2025's climate policy. Joseph Rainey Center for Public Policy president Sarah E. Hunt considered the Inflation Reduction Act crucial, and U.S. representative (now U.S. senator) John Curtis said it was vital that Republicans "engage in supporting good energy and climate policy". American Conservation Coalition founder Benji Backer noted growing consensus among younger Republicans that human activity causes climate change, and called the project wrongheaded.

The project abandons the habitat conservation goal of 30 by 30, and advocates that the National Flood Insurance Program be replaced by private insurers. The League of Conservation Voters has criticized this as a giveaway to private industry.

=== Expansion of presidential powers ===
Project 2025 seeks to place the federal government's entire executive branch under direct presidential control, eliminating the independence of the DOJ, the FBI, the Federal Communications Commission, the Federal Trade Commission, and other agencies. The plan is based on a controversial interpretation of unitary executive theory, "an expansive interpretation of presidential power that aims to centralize greater control over the government in the White House." Kevin Roberts said that all federal employees should answer to the president. Since the Reagan administration, the Supreme Court has embraced a stronger unitary executive led by conservative justices, the Federalist Society, and the Heritage Foundation, and overturned some precedents limiting Project 2025's vision of executive power.

Project 2025 advocates that all Department of State employees in leadership roles be dismissed before January 20, 2025. It explicitly recommends replacing these executive branch positions with ideologically vetted State Department leaders appointed to acting roles that do not require Senate confirmation. Kiron Skinner, who wrote the State Department chapter of Project 2025, ran the department's office of policy planning for less than a year during the Trump administration before being forced out of the department. She considers most State Department employees too left-wing and wants them replaced by those more loyal to a conservative president. When asked by Peter Bergen in June 2024 if she could name a time when State Department employees obstructed Trump policy, she said she could not.

If Project 2025 were implemented, congressional approval would not be required for the sale of military equipment and ammunition to a foreign nation, unless "unanimous congressional support is guaranteed".

In 2019, Trump said that Article Two of the U.S. Constitution grants him the "right to do whatever as president", a common claim among supporters of the unitary executive theory. Similarly, in 2018, Trump claimed he could fire special counsel Robert Mueller. Trump is not the first president to consider policies related to the unitary executive theory. The idea has seen a resurgence and popularization within the Republican Party since the 9/11 terrorist attacks in 2001.

In 2023, Stephen Miller proposed immediately mobilizing the military at the start of second Trump administration for domestic law and immigration enforcement under the Insurrection Act of 1807. Jeffrey Clark, a senior fellow at CRA and Project 2025 contributor, has investigated using the Insurrection Act for other purposes, including suppressing protests like the George Floyd protests. The Heritage Foundation denied Project 2025 planned to use the Insurrection Act, but Mandate has a single line that says it is possible to use the Insurrection Act to secure the southern border. Russell Vought said the CRA was working to keep legal and defense communities from preventing use of the Insurrection Act.

Clark also promoted making the Department of Justice less independent of the president in order to let Trump prosecute his political rivals. For his alleged acts while working at the DOJ during the end of Trump's term, Clark has become a co-defendant in the Georgia election racketeering prosecution and an unnamed co-conspirator in the federal prosecution of Trump for alleged election obstruction. According to reporting in outlets such as NBC News and NPR, Heritage officials have denied that Project 2025 includes plans to prosecute political opponents, framing such accusations as mischaracterizations of the initiative.

Several Project 2025 partners praised the 2024 Supreme Court decision Trump v. United States, which grants broad immunity from prosecution for acts committed in the course of a president's official duties. Project 2025 opposed the Supreme Court decision Humphrey's Executor v. United States, and in 2026, the Trump administration successfully sued to overturn it, in Trump v. Slaughter.

Political experts have said Project 2025 represents significant executive aggrandizement, a type of democratic backsliding involving government institutional changes made by elected executives that has been seen in Russia, Hungary, Turkey, and Venezuela. Cornell University political scientist Rachel Beatty Riedl said that this global phenomenon represented threats to democratic rule not from violence but from using democratic institutions to consolidate executive power. She said, "if Project 2025 is implemented, what it means is a dramatic decrease in American citizens' ability to engage in public life based on the kind of principles of liberty, freedom and representation that are accorded in a democracy." Phillip Wallach, a senior fellow studying separation of powers at the American Enterprise Institute, characterized the project as visions that bleed into authoritarian fantasies.

Donald B. Ayer, the deputy attorney general under George H. W. Bush, said,

Project 2025 seems to be full of a whole array of ideas that are designed to let Donald Trump function as a dictator, by completely eviscerating many of the restraints built into our system. He really wants to destroy any notion of a rule of law in this country ... The reports about Donald Trump's Project 2025 suggest that he is now preparing to do a bunch of things totally contrary to the basic values we have always lived by. If Trump were to be elected and implement some of the ideas he is apparently considering, no one in this country would be safe.

=== Federal staffing ===
Project 2025 proposes reclassifying tens of thousands of federal civil service workers as political appointees in order to replace them with Trump loyalists. The Heritage Foundation established a database for potential applicants for federal employment shaped by the ideology of Donald Trump. Throughout his first term, Trump was accused of removing people he considered disloyal, regardless of their ideological conviction, such as former attorney general William Barr. In 2020, White House Presidential Personnel Office employees James Bacon and John McEntee developed a questionnaire to test potential government employees' commitment to Trumpism. Bacon and McEntee joined Project 2025 in May 2023. The Heritage Foundation uses a similar questionnaire to screen potential recruits for employment in the federal government for adherence to its agenda. For Trump's second term the project recommends that a White House Counsel be selected who is "deeply committed" to the president's "America First" agenda.

In 2020, Trump established the Schedule F job classification by executive order. Biden rescinded this classification at the beginning of his presidency. Russell Vought, who worked on Schedule F during Trump's first term, joined Project 2025. He said that Trump's second term would destroy the administrative state and fire and traumatize federal workers. He advocated reviving Schedule F during Trump's second term. Kevin Roberts said: "People will lose their jobs. Hopefully their lives are able to flourish in spite of that. Buildings will be shut down. Hopefully they can be repurposed for private industry." On January 20, 2025, Trump signed an executive order to that effect.

In response to Schedule F's reinstatement, several unions sued and took other protective measures to prevent its full implementation. At the end of Biden's term, about 4,000 government positions were deemed political appointments. If fully implemented, Schedule F will affect tens of thousands of professional federal civil servants who have spent many years working under both Democratic and Republican administrations. According to Georgetown University professor of public policy Donald Moynihan, while apolitical and meritocratic selection of public servants is vital to administrative functioning, the Republican Party increasingly views them and public sector unions as threats, or resources to be controlled. Political scientist Francis Fukuyama has said that while the federal bureaucracy is in dire need of reform, Schedule F would "dangerously undermine" the government's functionality.

In 2023, the Heritage Foundation said it planned to have 20,000 personnel in its database by the end of 2024.

Project 2025 encourages Congress to require federal contractors to be 70% U.S. citizens, ultimately raising the limit to 95%. It also calls for the president to reinstate Executive Orders 13836, 13837 and 13839, which relate to how federal agencies address labor unions, grievances, and seniority.

By June 2024, the American Accountability Foundation, a conservative opposition research organization led by former Senate aide Tom Jones, was researching certain key high-ranking federal civil servants' backgrounds. Called Project Sovereignty 2025, the undertaking received a $100,000 grant from Heritage. Its objective was to post online the names of 100 people who might oppose Trump's agenda. Announcing the grant in May 2024, Heritage wrote that the research's purpose was "to alert Congress, a conservative administration, and the American people to the presence of anti-American bad actors burrowed into the administrative state and ensure appropriate action is taken." Some found Project Sovereignty 2025 reminiscent of McCarthyism, when many Americans were persecuted and blacklisted as alleged communists.

Max Stier of the Partnership for Public Service voiced concern the project would revive the early-American spoils-and-patronage system that awarded government jobs to those loyal to a party or elected official rather than by merit. The Pendleton Act of 1883 mandated that federal jobs be awarded by merit. Former Trump campaign and presidency senior advisor Steve Bannon has advocated for the plan on his War Room podcast, hosting Jeffrey Clark and others working on the project.

=== Healthcare and public health ===
Roger Severino wrote Mandate's chapter on health care. He accuses the Biden administration of undermining the traditional nuclear family, and wants to reform the Department of Health and Human Services (HHS) to promote this household structure.

One example Severino gives is the Biden administration's reversal of the Trump-era finding that using stem cells derived from abortions is unethical. This finding prevented HHS from funding research that uses abortion-derived stem cells.

According to Project 2025, the federal government should promote the Medicare Advantage program, which consists of private insurance plans, and federal healthcare providers should deny transgender people gender-affirming care.

Project 2025 suggests a number of ways to cut funding for Medicaid, such as caps on federal funding, limits on lifetime benefits per capita, and letting state governments impose stricter work requirements on beneficiaries of the program. Other proposals include limiting state use of provider taxes, eliminating preexisting federal beneficiary protections and requirements, increasing eligibility determinations and asset test determinations to make it harder to enroll in, apply for, and renew Medicaid, providing an option to turn Medicaid into a voucher program, and eliminating federal oversight of state Medicaid programs. The project also advocates cutting funding to the Department of Veterans Affairs (VA).

Project 2025 aims to alter the National Institutes of Health (NIH) by making it easier to fire employees and to remove DEI programs. Conservatives consider the NIH corrupt and politically biased. Severino says the CDC should not publish health advice, because it is inherently political.

=== Immigration reforms ===
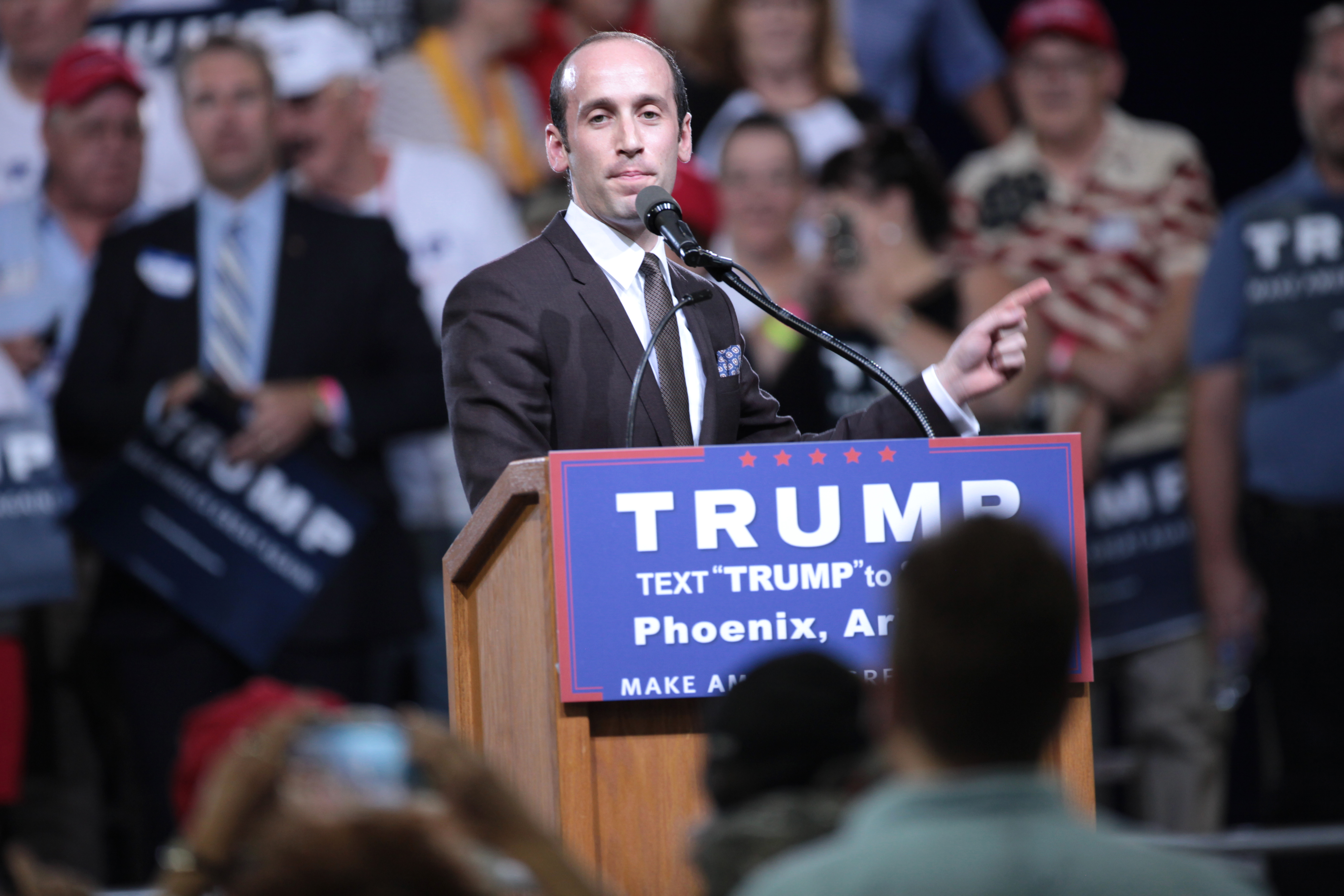
Stephen Miller, known for his anti-immigration views, was and remains a key figure in forming Trump's immigration policy.

This Mandate for Leadership suggests abolishing the Department of Homeland Security (DHS) and replacing it with an immigration agency that incorporates Customs and Border Protection (CBP), the Transportation Security Administration (TSA), Immigration and Customs Enforcement (ICE), the U.S. Citizenship and Immigration Services (USCIS), and elements of the departments of Health and Human Services and DOJ. Other tasks could be privatized. The admission of refugees would be curtailed, and processing fees for asylum seekers would increase, something the Project deems "an opportunity for a significant influx of money". Immigrants who wish to have their applications fast-tracked would have to pay even more.

In April 2024, Heritage said that Project 2025 policy includes "arresting, detaining, and removing immigration violators anywhere in the United States".

Stephen Miller, a key architect of immigration policy during the Trump presidency, is a major figure in Project 2025. In November 2023, Miller told Project 2025 participant Charlie Kirk that the operation would rival the scale and complexity of "building the Panama Canal". He said it would include deputizing the National Guard in red states as immigration enforcement officers under Trump's command. These forces would then be deployed in blue states.

In late 2023, Miller was reported to have considered deputizing local police and sheriffs for the undertaking, as well as agents of the Bureau of Alcohol, Tobacco, Firearms and Explosives and the Drug Enforcement Administration. These forces could then arrest illegal immigrants nationwide. Detainees would then be held in internment camps near the border before deportation. Trump has also spoken of rounding up homeless people in blue cities and detaining them in camps. Funding for the Mexico–United States border wall would increase.

Project 2025 encourages the president to withhold federal disaster relief funds granted by the Federal Emergency Management Agency (FEMA) should state or local governments refuse to abide by federal immigration laws, by, for example, not sharing information with law enforcement.

=== Identity ===
Project 2025 opposes what it calls "radical gender ideology" and advocates that the government "maintain a biblically based, social-science-reinforced definition of marriage and family". To achieve this, it proposes removing protections against discrimination on the basis of sexual or gender identity, and eliminating provisions pertaining to diversity, equity, and inclusion (DEI)—which it calls "state-sanctioned racism"—from federal legislation. Federal employees who have participated in DEI programs or any initiatives involving critical race theory might be fired.

Public school teachers who want to use a transgender student's preferred pronouns would be required to obtain written permission from the student's legal guardian. Project 2025's backers also want to target the private sector by reversing "the DEI revolution in labor policy" in favor of more "race-neutral" regulations. Project 2025 is part of a trend of intensifying backlash against DEI in the early 2020s.

Mandate promotes disbanding the White House's Gender Policy Council. Government agencies would be forbidden from instituting quotas and collecting statistics on gender, race, or ethnicity. Project contributor Jonathan Berry explains, "The goal here is to move toward colorblindness and to recognize that we need to have laws and policies that treat people like full human beings not reducible to categories, especially when it comes to race." The U.S. Census Bureau would be reformed according to conservative principles.

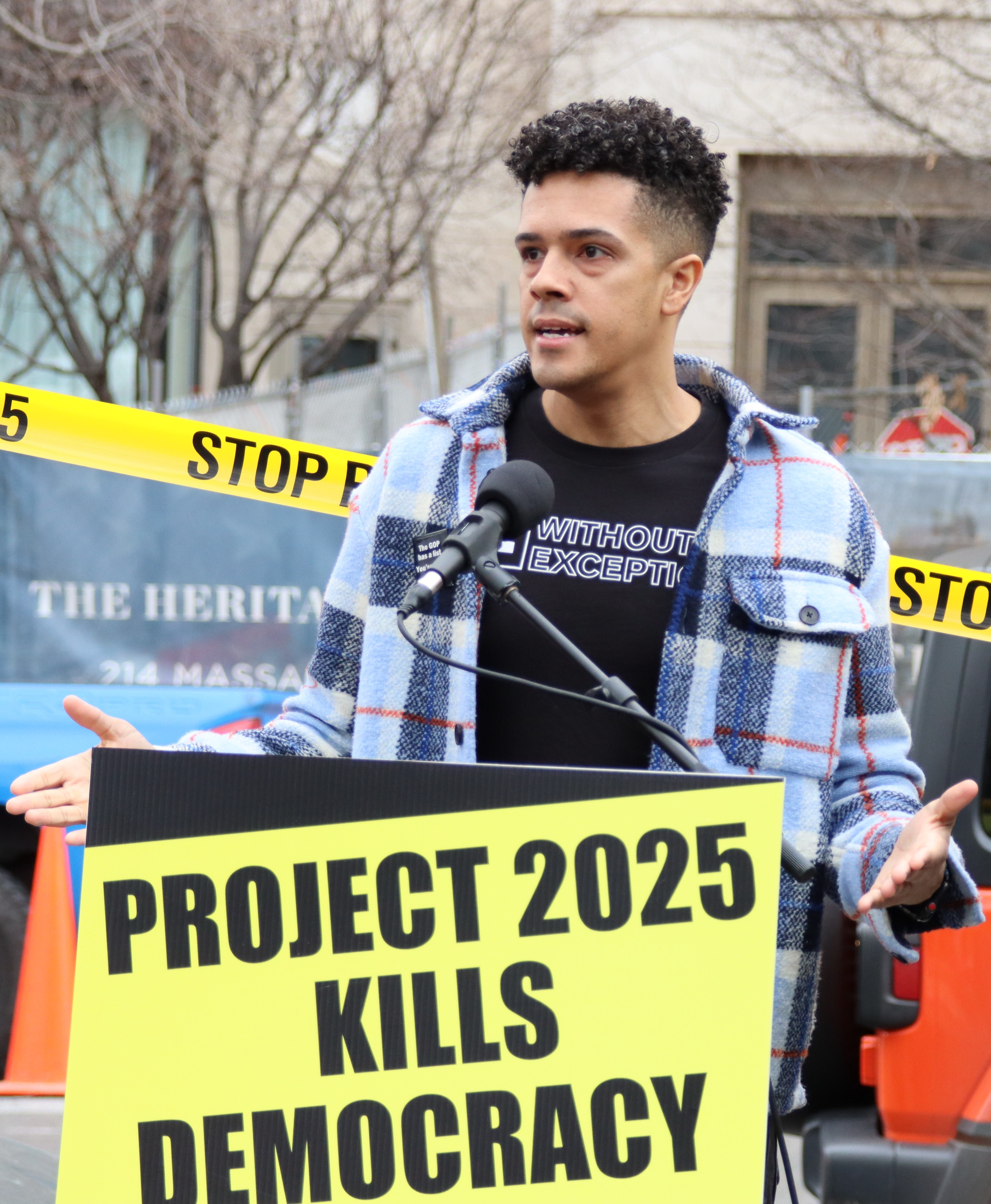
Human Rights Campaign national press secretary Brandon Wolf speaking at a rally against Project 2025

LGBTQ+ writers and journalists have criticized Project 2025 for its proposals to remove protections for LGBTQ+ people and to outlaw pornography by claiming it is an "omnipresent propagation of transgender ideology and sexualization of children". Writing for Dame magazine, Brynn Tannehill argued that The Mandate for Leadership in part "makes eradicating LGBTQ people from public life its top priority", while citing passages from the playbook linking pornography to "transgender ideology", arguing that it is related to other anti-transgender attacks in 2023.

=== Journalism ===
Project 2025 proposes reconsidering the accommodations given to journalists who are members of the White House Press Corps. It proposes defunding the Corporation for Public Broadcasting, a private, nonprofit corporation that provides funding for the Public Broadcasting Service and National Public Radio, as "good policy and good politics" because it accounts for "half a billion dollars squandered on leftist opinion each year".

It also entertains the idea of revoking NPR stations' noncommercial status, forcing them to move outside the 88–92 range on the FM dial, which could then be taken by religious programming. Brendan Carr, who wrote the article on the Federal Communications Commission in Project 2025, was appointed by Trump to lead the FCC, and subsequently launched an investigation into NPR and PBS, in accordance with Project 2025.

The Project also proposes allowing more media consolidation by changing FCC rules that would allow for the converting local news programs into national news programs.

=== Elections ===
The project pushes for legislation requiring social media companies to not remove mainstream political positions from their platforms. It also would prevent the Federal Elections Commission from countering misinformation or disinformation about election integrity. The nonprofit law institute Brennan Center for Justice wrote in an expert brief, "Project 2025 threatens to amplify attacks on election officials and throw the weight of the federal government behind those antidemocratic efforts." The institute added that Project 2025 could imperil election officials by misusing the Department of Justice to target those whose actions do not align with the president's ideology.

=== Law enforcement ===
In the view of Project 2025, the Department of Justice (DOJ) has become "a bloated bureaucracy with a critical core of personnel who are infatuated with the perpetuation of a radical liberal agenda" and has "forfeited the trust" of the American people due to its role in the investigation of alleged Trump–Russia collusion. It must therefore be thoroughly reformed and closely overseen by the White House, and the director of the Federal Bureau of Investigation (FBI) must be personally accountable to the president.

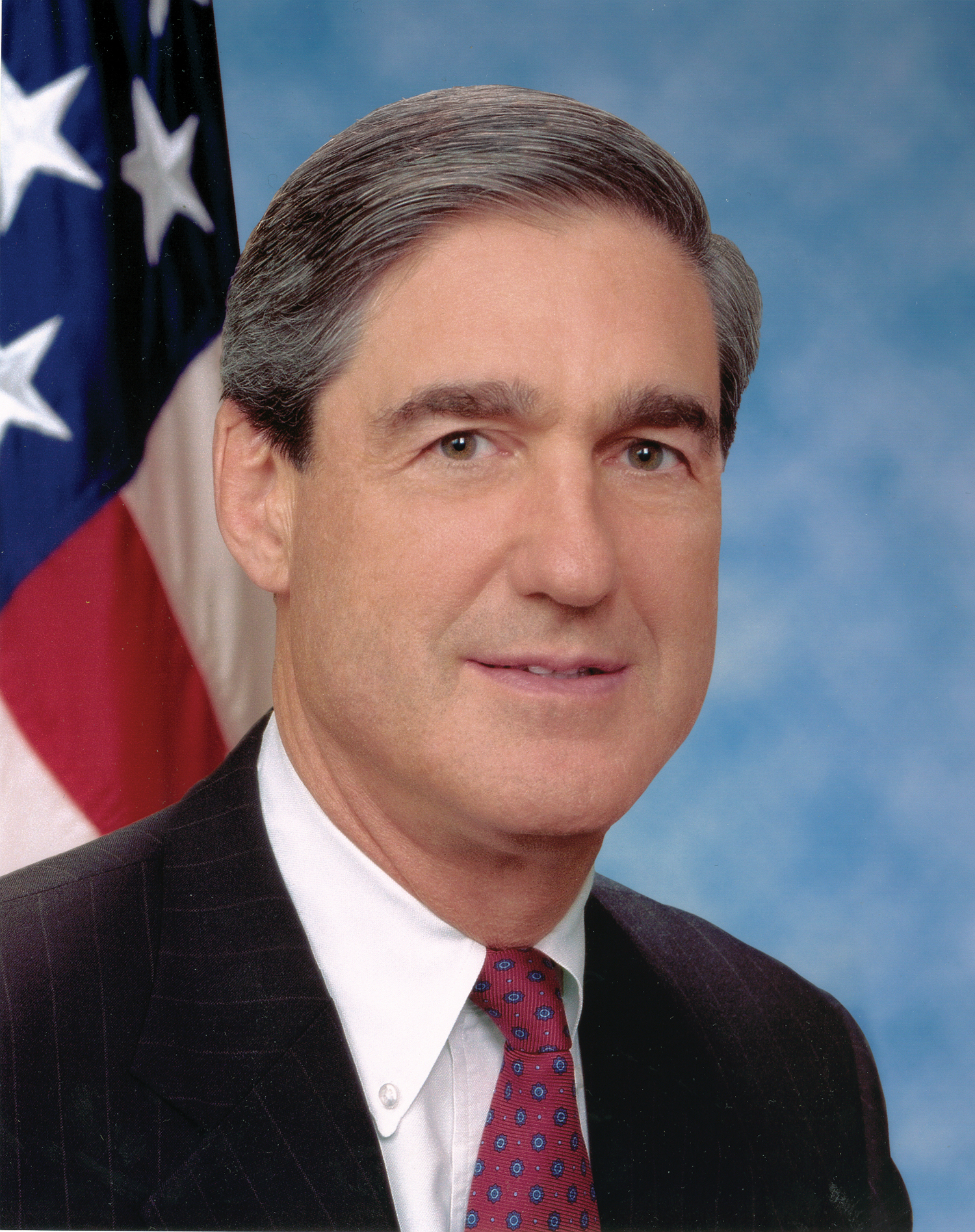
The DOJ and the FBI are considered problematic by Project 2025, because of the investigation by Special Counsel Robert Mueller, former director of the FBI, into Donald Trump.

A DOJ reformed per Project 2025's recommendations would combat affirmative discrimination or anti-white racism, citing the Civil Rights Act of 1964. The plan also envisions making the FBI and DOJ more directly accountable to the president and expanding eligibility for the federal death penalty. PBS News Hour linked these ambitions with discussions of National Guard deployments in domestic contexts, noting concerns that law enforcement powers could be militarized under Project 2025. In 2024, a Project 2025 subgroup, the Border Security Workgroup, crafted plans for a new nationwide militarized fusion center-style law enforcement system of command to execute Trump's mass deportations and other national security objectives. It would include "counter intelligence" against those who oppose Trump's objectives and would be under Trump's direct control. The plans called for the involvement of military forces at every level of domestic law enforcement.

Former Trump DOJ official Gene Hamilton argues that "advancing the interests of certain segments of American society... comes at the expense of other Americans—and in nearly all cases violates longstanding federal law" and that the DOJ's Civil Rights Division would therefore "prosecute all state and local governments, institutions of higher education, corporations, and any other private employers" with DEI or affirmative action programs. Hamilton was also general counsel for America First Legal, a Project 2025 partner organization.

Legal settlements called consent decrees between the DOJ and local police departments would be curtailed. According to Project 2025, if the responsibilities of the FBI and another federal agency, such as the Drug Enforcement Administration (DEA), overlapped, then the latter should take the lead, leaving the FBI to concentrate on (other) serious crimes and threats to national security.

Project 2025 advocates expanding the use of the death penalty to include crimes such as pedophilia. During Trump's first term, the federal government carried out the first federal death sentence since 2003. In 2008, the U.S. Supreme Court ruled in Kennedy v. Louisiana that capital punishment for child rape violates the Eighth Amendment to the United States Constitution.

Like Trump, Project 2025 believes that the District of Columbia is infested with crime and, as such, suggests authorizing the Uniformed Division of the Secret Service to enforce the law outside of the White House and the immediate surroundings.

Michael Bromwich, who was Justice Department inspector general from 1994 to 1999, said:

The plans being developed by members of Trump's cult to turn the DOJ and FBI into instruments of his revenge should send shivers down the spine of anyone who cares about the rule of law. Trump and rightwing media have planted in fertile soil the seed that the current Department of Justice has been politicized, and the myth has flourished. Their attempts to undermine DOJ and the FBI are among the most destructive campaigns they have conducted.

Peter M. Shane, a law professor who writes about the rule of law and the separation of powers, wrote, "Vought would unblinkingly jettison the norm of independence that presidents and attorneys general of both parties have carefully nurtured since Watergate."

=== National security ===
In the Mandate, Christopher Miller derides the Biden administration for letting U.S. military capabilities decay. The preface says, "For 30 years, America's political, economic, and cultural leaders embraced and enriched Communist China and its genocidal Communist Party while hollowing out America's industrial base." Miller voices concerns about China, warning that the country is building up its military and that its nuclear arsenal could rival that of the United States. He discusses the need to maintain a balance of power that prevents China from becoming a regional hegemon. He suggests that China is a belligerent state best countered by an expanded nuclear arms program and raised expectations of regional allies like South Korea and Japan.

Project 2025 identifies all communist and socialist parties and states, including China, as threats to American national security. It expresses concern over China's influence on American society. It suggests mitigating these concerns through efforts such as banning TikTok and the Confucius Institutes. It accuses TikTok of espionage and the Confucius Institutes of corrupting American higher education. The Project also expresses concern over Chinese intellectual property theft and accuses Big Tech of acting on the behalf of the Chinese Communist Party to undermine the U.S. It encourages U.S. pension funds to avoid Chinese investments and recommends that U.S. companies seeking to invest in sensitive sectors in China face restrictions or denial of permission.

On the campaign trail for his second term, Trump avoided giving specific foreign policy plans. Project 2025 favors neither interventionism nor isolationism, instead insisting that all decisions related to foreign policy prioritize national interests. It prefers transactional bilateral agreements to maintaining and building alliances. In the Mandate, Max Primorac suggests significant changes to the U.S. Agency for International Development (USAID)'s mission due to controversial issues such as the organization's promotion of abortion as healthcare, policies to mitigate climate change, acknowledgment of gender identities, and campaigns against systemic racism. Primorac recommends excising the words gender, abortion, reproductive health, and sexual and reproductive rights from all USAID programs and documents.

==== Nuclear weapons policy ====
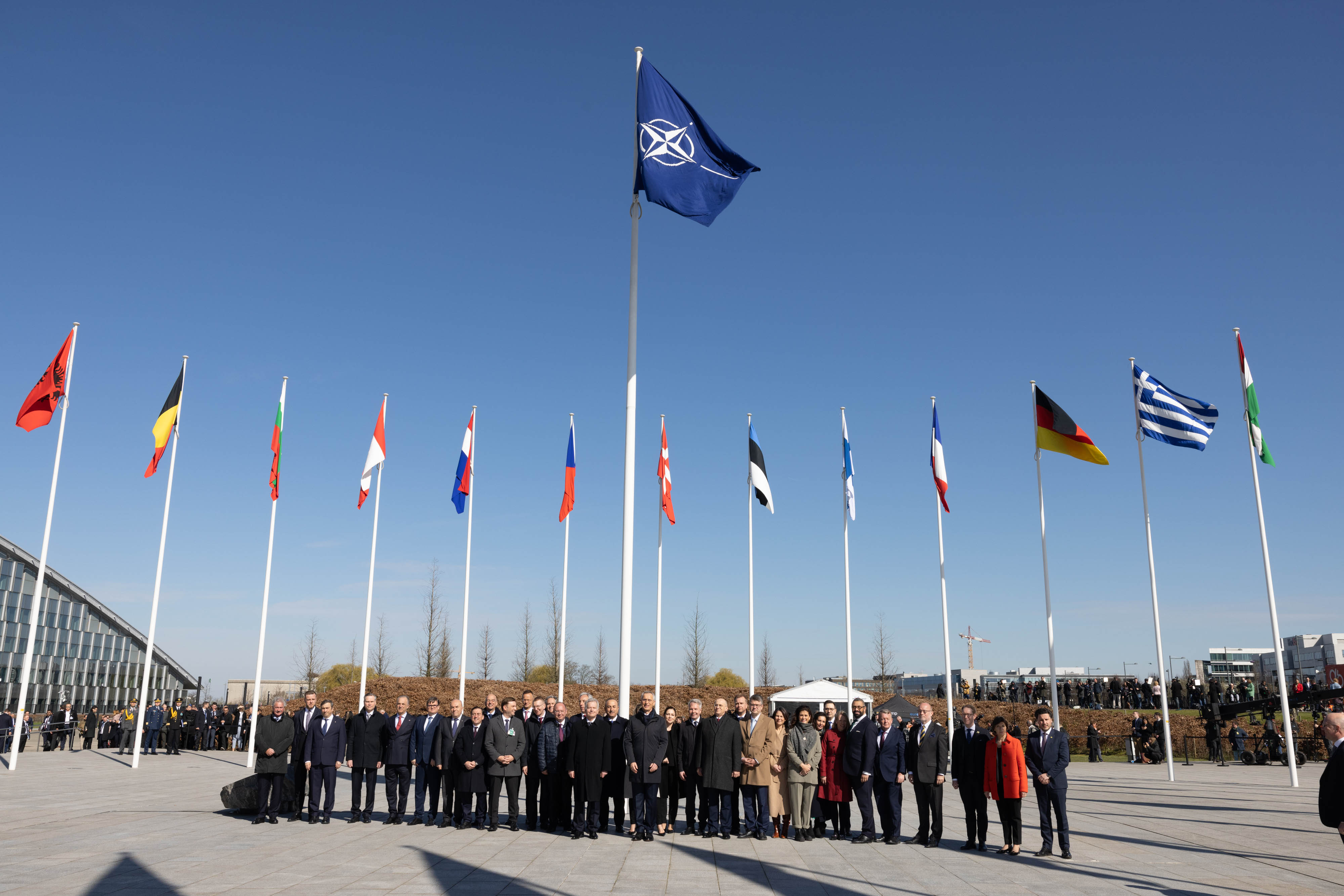
Project 2025 proposes pressuring NATO member states to increase their military spending, in order to confront threats from Russia.

Mandate argues that the U.S. should maintain its nuclear umbrella only for nations in the North Atlantic Treaty Organization (NATO), and that these countries should be responsible for deploying their own conventional forces to deter Russian aggression. As of June 2024, 24 of the 32 NATO members had allocated at least 2% of their Gross Domestic Product (GDP) to defense.

Christopher Miller advocates that the U.S. replace all its Cold War nuclear capabilities and infrastructure and develop the LGM-35 Sentinel. He also promotes testing more weapons in violation of the Comprehensive Nuclear-Test-Ban Treaty. The Biden administration also promoted the Sentinel's development.

More specifically, Mandate calls for a speech shortly after inauguration to "make the case to the American people that nuclear weapons are the ultimate guarantor of their freedom and prosperity", to be followed by additional funding for nuclear weapons modernization programs to develop and produce new warheads such as W87-1 Mod and W88 Alt 370 and deploy as-yet-unproven directed-energy and space-based weapons and a "cruise missile defense of the homeland". The plan advocates continuing the B61-12 and W80 modernization programs, which began in 2013 and 2014 respectively and have been continued by each administration since. It also advocates restarting funding for nuclear armed submarine-launched cruise missiles. The Obama administration retired similar missile programs in 2010. Trump restarted funding these SLCM-N in 2018, but the Biden administration canceled the funding in 2022.

Plans include placing multiple warheads on each Minuteman III ICBM and its Sentinel replacement by 2026, putting nuclear warheads on Army ground-launched missiles, adding nuclear capabilities to hypersonic missile systems, directing the Air Force to investigate a road-mobile ICBM launcher, expanding the pre-positioning of nuclear bombs and weapons in Europe and Asia, and directing the National Nuclear Security Administration (NNSA) to "transition to a wartime footing". This would be funded by directing the NNSA to submit monthly briefings to the Oval Office and separate budget requests from the Energy Department, along with directing the Office of Management and Budget to submit a supplemental budget request to Congress.

The Bulletin of the Atomic Scientists called Project 2025's nuclear policy "the most dramatic buildup of nuclear weapons since the start of the Reagan administration" and the beginning of a new global nuclear arms race. It includes the prioritization of nuclear weapons development and production over other security programs, rejecting Congressional efforts to find cost-effective alternatives for the plans, increasing the number of nuclear weapons above treaty limits, rejecting current arms control treaties, expanding the NNSA's capability and funding, preparing to test new nuclear weapons despite the Comprehensive Nuclear Test Ban Treaty, and accelerating all missile defense programs. Project 2025 would require the Defense Department to abolish its DEI programs and immediately reinstate all service members discharged for not getting vaccinated against COVID-19. The United States Armed Forces would not be authorized to take climate change into account in evaluating national security threats.

=== Pornography and adult content ===
In the foreword of Project 2025's Mandate, Kevin Roberts argues that pornography promotes sexual deviance, the sexualization of children, and the exploitation of women; is not protected by the First Amendment to the United States Constitution; and should be banned. He recommends the criminal prosecution of people and companies producing pornography, which he compares to addictive drugs. Previously, the Supreme Court has ruled against attempts to ban pornography on First Amendment grounds.

Roberts has said that although Trump has appeared in Playboy magazine and had an affair with a porn actor, he could still be a powerful advocate against pornography because "our Lord works with imperfect instruments". When the Republican Party nominated him for president in 2016, Trump signed a pledge to examine the "public health impact of Internet pornography on youth, families and the American culture". He did not fulfill this promise. The American Principles Project, part of the Project 2025 advisory board, has advocated for state laws that reduce pornography's accessibility.

=== Transportation infrastructure ===
Project 2025 recommends curtailing the Bipartisan Infrastructure Law of 2021, which authorizes funding for de-carbonizing transportation infrastructure. It views the Federal Transit Administration (FTA) unfavorably, calling it a waste of money. It suggests cutting federal funding for transit agencies nationwide in the form of the Capital Investment Grants (CIG) program. It wants the FTA to conduct "rigorous cost–benefit analysis" even though the agency already scrutinizes projects before allocating funding.

=== Abortion and reproductive healthcare ===
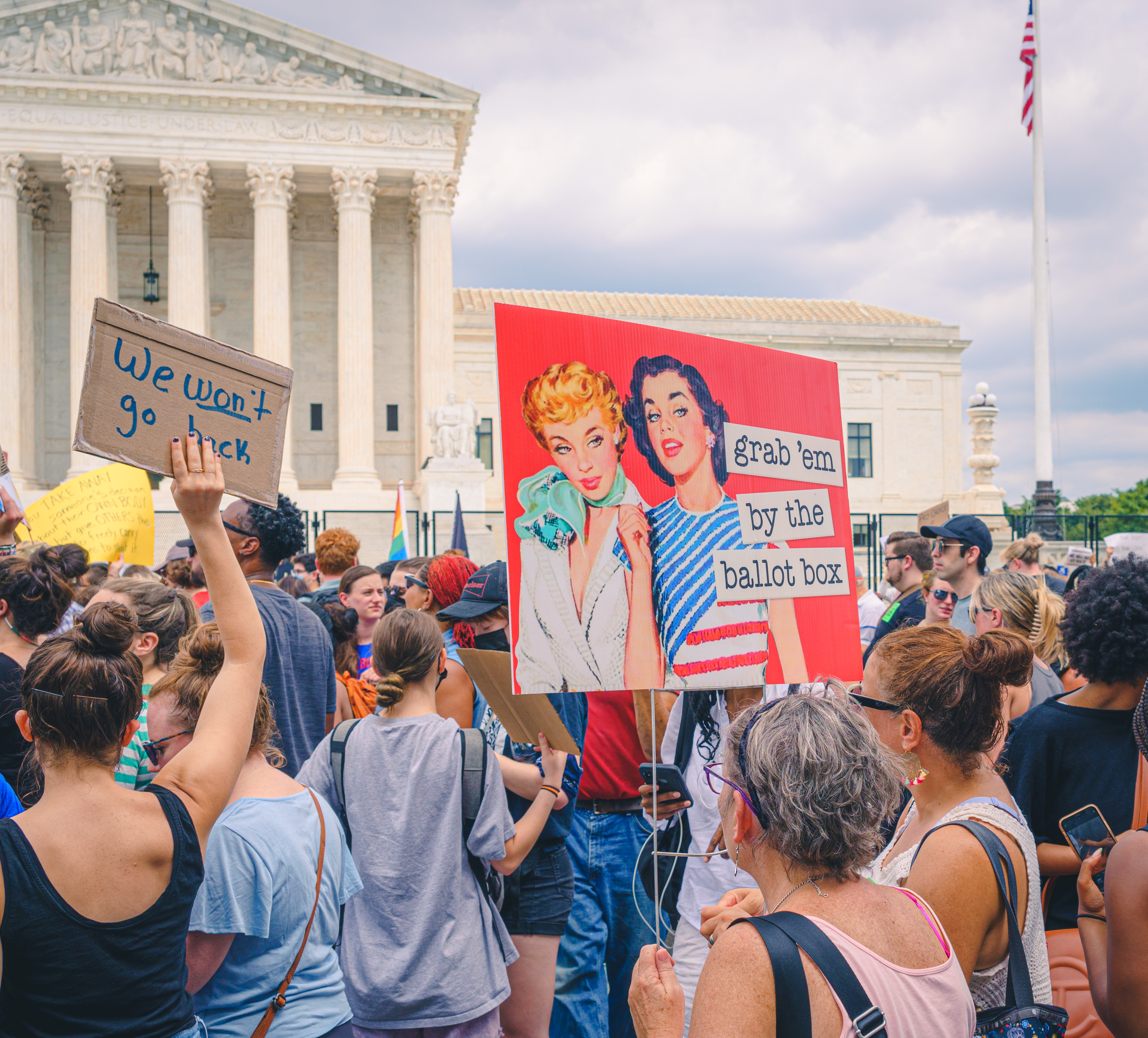
Demonstrators advocating for abortion rights, which Project 2025 plans to limit

Project 2025's proponents maintain that life begins at conception. The Mandate says that the Department of Health and Human Services (HHS) should "return to being known as the Department of Life", as Trump HHS secretary Alex Azar nicknamed it in January 2020, voicing his pride in being "part of the most pro-life administration in this country's history". Project 2025 said Trump should align federal organizations with the policy that abortion is not health care and promote American health "from conception to natural death".

In 2022, the Supreme Court ruled in Dobbs v. Jackson Women's Health Organization that, contrary to Roe v. Wade, state abortion bans are constitutional, but Project 2025 encourages the next president "to enact the most robust protections for the unborn that Congress will support".

Severino told a Students for Life conference that Project 2025 was developing executive orders and proposing regulations to roll back Biden's abortion policies and solidify a new environment in the wake of Dobbs. For example, the Reproductive Healthcare Access Task Force Biden created would be replaced by a dedicated pro-life agency that would advocate for health of unborn children and women with newfound authority.

The project opposes any initiatives that in its view subsidize single parenthood. It encourages the next administration to rescind some of the provisions of the Family Planning Services and Population Research Act of 1970, enacted as Title X of Public Health Service Act, which offers reproductive healthcare services, and to require participating clinics to emphasize the importance of marriage to potential parents.

Severino writes in the project's manifesto that the Food and Drug Administration should reverse its approval of the abortion pills mifepristone and misoprostol on ethical grounds. Project 2025 proposes eliminating insurance coverage of the morning-after pill Ella, which insurance companies are required to cover under the Affordable Care Act (ACA). Severino also recommends that the Centers for Disease Control and Prevention "update its public messaging about the unsurpassed effectiveness of modern fertility awareness-based methods" of contraception, such as smartphone applications that track a woman's menstrual cycle. He says that the HHS should require states to report the method and motivation of each abortion, the gestational age of the fetus, and the mother's state of residence.

The project seeks to restore Trump-era "religious and moral exemptions" to contraceptive requirements under the ACA, including emergency contraception (Plan B), which it deems an abortifacient, to defund Planned Parenthood, and to remove protection of medical records involving abortions from criminal investigations if the records' owners cross state lines. Project 2025 contributor Emma Waters told Politico, "I've been very concerned with just the emphasis on expanding more and more contraception." According to her, Project 2025's policy recommendations constitute not restrictions but rather "medical safeguards" for women. Waters said she wanted the NIH to investigate contraception's long-term effects.

In Project 2025's "Department of Justice" section, Gene Hamilton calls for enforcement of federal law against using the U.S. Postal Service for transportation of medicines that induce abortion. Project 2025 seeks to revive provisions of the Comstock Act that banned mail delivery of any "instrument, substance, drug, medicine, or thing" that could be used for an abortion. Congress and the courts have narrowed Comstock laws, allowing contraceptives to be delivered by mail.

Project 2025 aims to enforce Comstock more rigorously at the national level to prohibit sending abortion pills and medical equipment used for abortions through the mail. The project proposes criminal prosecution of senders and receivers of abortion pills. It does not explicitly advocate banning abortion, but some legal experts and abortion rights advocates said adopting the Project's plan would cut off access to medical equipment used in surgical abortions to create a de facto national abortion ban.

To prevent teenage pregnancy, Project 2025 advises the federal government to deprecate what it considers promotion of abortion and high-risk sexual behaviors among adolescents. It also seeks to remove HHS's role in shaping sex education, arguing that this is tantamount to creating a monopoly.

== Other initiatives ==
=== Database ===
To be admitted to the "Presidential Personnel Database", a recruit must respond to several prompts about their ideologies. One is "name one living public policy figure whom you greatly admire and why". A recruit's social media accounts will be scrutinized. The key people involved with the database are former Trump administration officials, including John McEntee.

Heritage claims to have nearly 20,000 profiles as of July 2024, though those could simply be empty after someone started the process and did not finish. Staffers have privately questioned how many of the people in the database could actually work in a future administration.

Once the second Trump presidency began, White House screening teams fanned out to federal agencies to screen job applicants for their loyalty to the president's agenda. On his first day in office, Trump signed an executive order to restore merit-based federal hiring practices and "dedication to our Constitution".

=== Training modules ===
The database and modules were low-budget productions focused on ideology rather than practice. ProPublica has published 23 of the videos Project 2025 created to support the training. Most of the speakers in the videos worked for Donald Trump in some capacity, including on his 2016–2017 transition team, in his administration, or in his 2024 reelection campaign.

=== Draft executive orders and 180-day playbook ===
Project 2025 and the CRA helped draft executive orders that are not public. They include invoking the Insurrection Act to deploy the military for domestic law enforcement, which the Heritage Foundation denied. Russell Vought also developed a 180-day playbook, which Project 2025 described as a defined transition plan for each federal agency to be undertaken during the first six months of Trump's second term. At least 38 Democratic members of Congress called on Project 2025 to release the playbook, saying it is in the public interest to know what is planned. In July 2024, CRA director of research Micah Meadowcroft said in a secretly recorded interview that the orders would be distributed during the presidential transition in such a way that they would never be made public.

=== Dawn's Early Light ===
On September 24, 2024, Heritage Foundation president and Project 2025 architect Kevin Roberts was due to release the book Dawn's Early Light: Taking Back Washington to Save America, with a foreword by Republican vice-presidential nominee JD Vance. The book was initially subtitled Burning Down Washington to Save America.

In the book, Roberts "outlines a peaceful 'Second American Revolution' for voters looking to shift the power back into the hands of the people". In a review of the book, Vance wrote: "We are now all realizing that it's time to circle the wagons and load the muskets. In the fights that lay ahead, these ideas are an essential weapon." Colin Dickey of the New Republic says the book reveals paranoid, Stalinist tactics like using conspiracy theories to violently enforce their vision for the world. Roberts criticizes birth control and law enforcement (preferring a more heavily armed frontier-like society), while promoting public prayer as a key tool in the competition with China.

On August 6, 2024, the book's release was postponed until after the November election.

Roberts held book release events in Manhattan and Washington, D.C. On November 13, 2024, The Guardian published an account of the hostile reception its reporter encountered at one of the events. Although invited to attend the event, the reporter was expelled.

== Reactions and responses ==
=== Allegations of authoritarianism ===
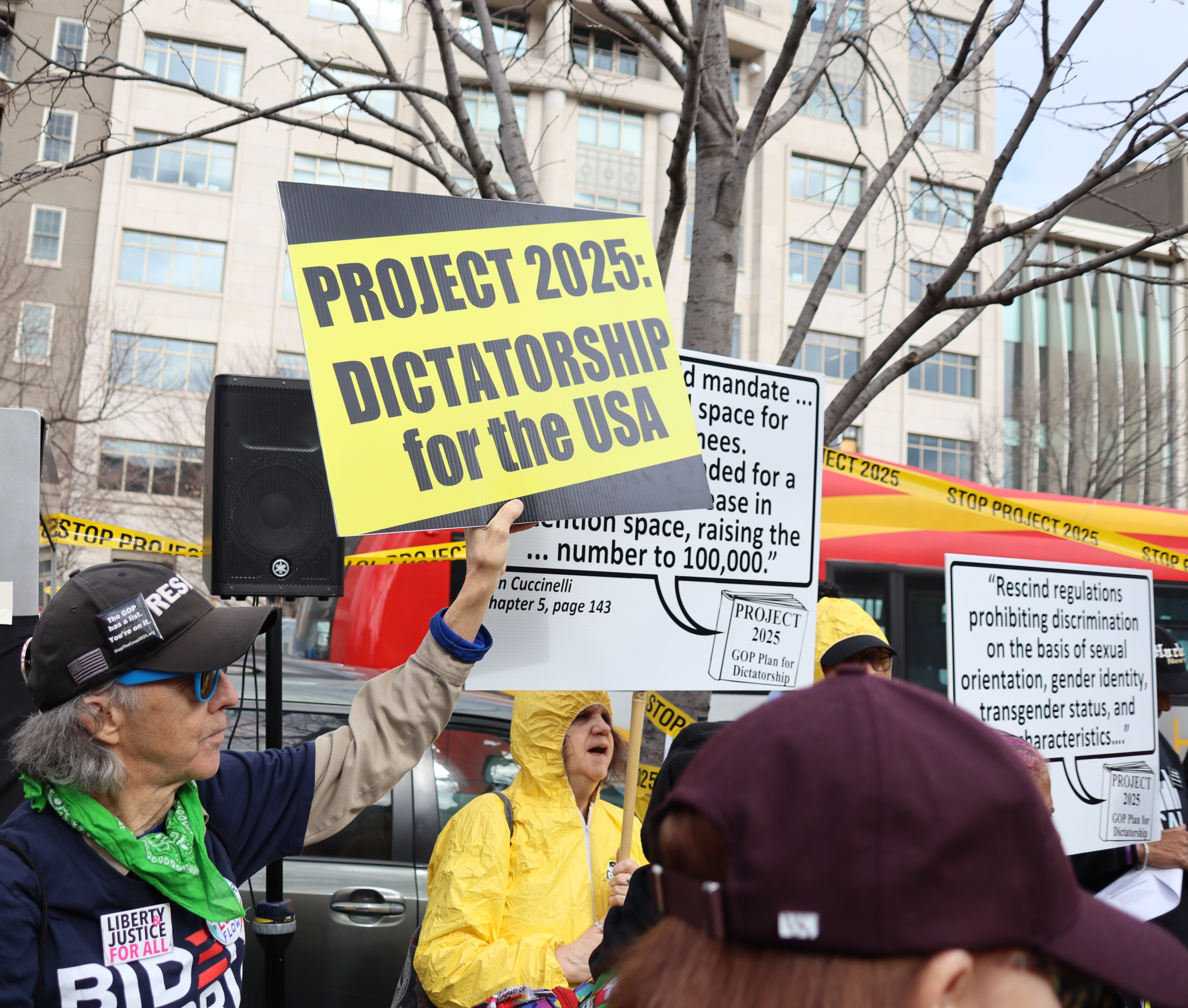
A protester holding a sign reading "Project 2025: Dictatorship for the USA"

Ruth Ben-Ghiat, a scholar of fascism and authoritarian leaders at New York University, wrote in May 2024 that Project 2025 "is a plan for an authoritarian takeover of the United States that goes by a deceptively neutral name". She said the project's intent to abolish federal departments and agencies "is to destroy the legal and governance cultures of liberal democracy and create new bureaucratic structures, staffed by new politically vetted cadres, to support autocratic rule". She continues:

Appropriating civil rights for white Christians furthers the Trumpist goal of delegitimizing the cause of racial equality while also making Christian nationalism a core value of domestic policy. Doing away with the separation of church and state is the goal of many architects of Trumpism, from Project 2025 contributor Russ Vought to far-right proselytizer Michael Flynn, who uses the idea of "spiritual war" as counterrevolutionary fuel ... Bannon, Roberts, Stephen Miller, and other American incarnations of fascism are convinced that counterrevolution leading to autocracy is the only path to political survival for the far right, given the unpopularity of their positions (especially on abortion) and their leader's boatload of legal troubles.

Former Naval War College professor Tom Nichols wrote that Trump is serious about jailing opponents and curtailing the rights of American citizens.

In Mother Jones, Washington bureau chief David Corn called Project 2025 "the right-wing infrastructure that is publicly plotting to undermine the checks and balances of our constitutional order and concentrate unprecedented power in the presidency. Its efforts, if successful and coupled with a Trump (or other GOP) victory in 2024, would place the nation on a path to autocracy."

In July 2024, Donald Moynihan of Georgetown University wrote that:

[Project 2025] would add measurably to the risks of corruption in American government. President Trump talks a lot about the deep state. Again, that is very similar to what authoritarians in other countries have tended to do to justify taking more direct control over civil service systems. So I think there is a dangerous pattern here, where it would not just reduce the quality of government. It would also open the door for abuses of political power.

Even some conservatives are more critical of the project, viewing it as a serious threat to democracy, civil rights, and the separation of church and state.

=== Political ===
The Biden campaign launched a website critical of Project 2025 hours before his June 27 debate with Trump. Kamala Harris continued the focus on Project 2025 when she became the Democratic presidential nominee. Public awareness of Project 2025 rose after Biden's and Harris's campaigns brought attention to it and said it would be Trump's agenda. The focus on opposition to Project 2025 increased during the transition from Biden to Harris as the nominee. In August 2024, an oversize copy of The Mandate was used as a prop during the 2024 Democratic National Convention.

Several conservatives and Republicans have criticized the plan for its stances on climate change and trade. Ron DeSantis embraced Project 2025 in August 2023.

After Trump won the 2024 United States presidential election, left-leaning media sources highlighted how right-wing commentators began saying on social media that Project 2025 was the official plan. Former White House advisor Steve Bannon and Texas official Bo French supported transparency about implementing Project 2025.

=== Other reactions and responses ===
In April 2024, responding to criticism of the project, Heritage released a document titled "5 Reasons Leftists HATE Project 2025". Restating many of its previously published objectives, the document said that "the radical Left hates families" and "wants to eliminate the family and replace it with the state"; that leftist "elites use the 'climate crisis' as a tool for scaring Americans into giving up their freedom"; that the "radical Left wants our country to travel down [the] same dark path" toward becoming the Soviet Union, North Korea, or Cuba; and that "woke propaganda" should be eliminated at every level of government.

External videos
- After Words interview with David Graham on The Project, May 2, 2025, C-SPAN

In July 2024, Oren Cass, contributing author of Mandate's chapter on the Department of Labor, criticized the project's leadership: "Gaining productive power requires focusing on people's problems and explaining how you are going to solve them, not pounding the table for Christian nationalism or a second American revolution." In April 2025, journalist David Graham published a book-length study, The Project: How Project 2025 Is Reshaping America.

== Implementation (2025–present) ==
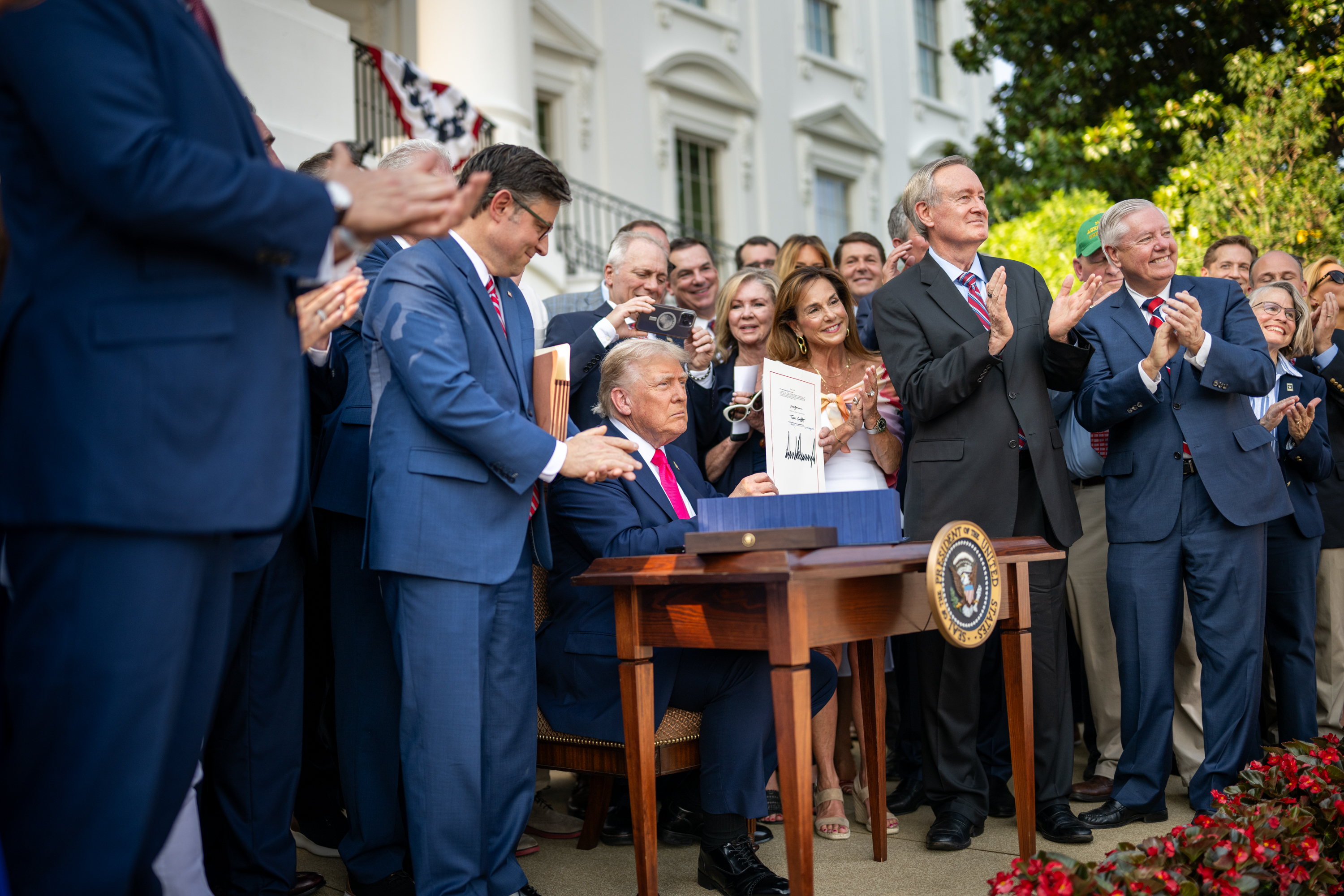
By signing the One Big Beautiful Bill Act into law on July 4, 2025, Trump effectively implemented many policies akin to Project 2025.

Trump's actions during his second term as president have reignited scrutiny of Project 2025, with critics warning that his administration is actively implementing its agenda across multiple sectors. Paul Dans has expressed satisfaction that Trump's early executive orders align with the project's Mandate for Leadership. Trump's early executive actions closely mirrored Project 2025's outline. This may indicate that his administration was rapidly enacting a pre-planned playbook. His executive orders on gender policies, federal hiring, and foreign aid reflected the project's policies, signaling a shift toward more autocratic governance. Trump's nominations were confirmed faster than in his first term and faster than Biden's cabinet nominations.

Several groups track the implementation of Project 2025, including the Center for Progressive Reform and Governing for Impact and the Project 2025 Tracker.

=== Roles in the second Trump administration ===
After Trump won the 2024 election, he nominated several Project 2025 contributors to positions in his second administration. His choice to lead the FCC, Brendan Carr, wrote the manifesto's chapter about the agency. Tom Homan, picked by Trump to act as a border czar, also contributed to the Project 2025 document. Trump nominated Russell Vought to direct the Office of Management and Budget. After these selections, Karoline Leavitt issued a statement saying "President Trump never had anything to do with Project 2025." Leavitt herself is an instructor for Project 2025's "Conservative Governance 101" training program and was chosen by Trump as White House Press Secretary.

Other authors or contributors to Project 2025 who have been nominated or appointed to roles in the second Trump administration include Michael Anton (contributor, appointed Director of Policy Planning); Paul S. Atkins (contributor, nominated for Chair of the Securities and Exchange Commission); Steven G. Bradbury (contributor, nominated for Deputy Secretary of Transportation); Troy Edgar (contributor, nominated for Deputy Secretary of Homeland Security); Jon Feere (contributor, appointed Chief of Staff at ICE); Pete Hoekstra (contributor, nominated for ambassador to Canada); Roman Jankowski (contributor, appointed Chief Privacy Officer and Chief Freedom of Information Act Officer for the Department of Homeland Security); and Peter Navarro (author, appointed Senior Counselor for Trade and Manufacturing). After writing some of the education policy proposals in Mandate, Lindsey Burke became the deputy chief of staff for policy and programs for the department of education.

=== Environmental regulation ===
Aspects of the project implemented in the first days of Trump's second term include executive orders to reopen large areas of Alaska, including the Arctic National Wildlife Refuge, to oil drilling, and the withdrawal of a pending Biden administration ban on PFAS in industrial discharge.

=== Federal workers ===
Metadata show that United States Office of Personnel Management memos sent to federal workers were written by Peter Noah and James Sherk, both associated with the Heritage Foundation.

=== Executive power ===
According to Media Matters for America, Trump's early budget freezes and spending cuts reflected Project 2025's aggressive push to downsize government programs and shift power to conservative institutions. In addition, his push to weaken FEMA is part of a broader Project 2025 strategy to reduce the federal government's role in disaster relief and shift responsibility to state and private entities.

On February 7, 2025, the National Institutes of Health (NIH) announced that it would change its maximum indirect cost rate for university research grants from 50% in some cases to 15%, as recommended by Project 2025.

Trump's policy on TikTok diverged from Project 2025's call to ban the app. (See: Donald Trump and TikTok)

Executive Order 14191—titled "Expanding Educational Freedom and Opportunity for Families—diverted funding from public schools to private school vouchers, a move directly aligned with Project 2025's goal to reshape the education system. Project 2025 advocated changes to foreign aid, including a foreign aid freeze; in January 2025, Trump initially signed an executive order freezing new foreign aid for 90 days, and later in January the administration sent a notice requiring that stop-work orders be issued for all existing foreign aid.

The executive order Restoring the Death Penalty and Protecting Public Safety was a step toward Project 2025's goal of expanding capital punishment. It directs the Attorney General to seek the death penalty in cases of murder of a police officer and capital crimes by illegal aliens. It also directs the DOJ to ensure that states that wish to apply the death penalty have a sufficient supply of lethal injection materials.

At the beginning of his second term, Trump signed Executive Order 14168, Executive Order 14187, and Executive Order 14183, which revoked the federal government's recognition of transgender people. In practice, this means the federal government will use sex in lieu of gender in documents. Additionally, only male and female options will be given on forms, and transgender inmates will be imprisoned according to their biological sex. The federal government also ceased to financially support gender-affirming surgery and attempted to ban transgender people from the military.

== See also ==
- America First Policy Institute – U.S. advocacy organization which has a transition project that is viewed as a rival to Project 2025
- Donald Trump and fascism
- Hiring and personnel concerns about Donald Trump
- Human rights inflation – Criticism of human rights expansion
- List of contributors to Project 2025
- Project 2029 – Democrat agenda for a potential Democratic US president in 2029
- Project Esther – American conservative project against pro-Palestinian protests and alleged antisemitism
- Southern strategy – 20th-century Republican electoral strategy for the Southern US
