= Paul Dans =

American politician and political operative

Personal details
- Born: Paul Edouard Dans; 1968 or 1969 (age 57–58)
- Party: Republican
- Spouse: Mary Helen Bowers (m. 2007)
- Children: 4
- Education: Massachusetts Institute of Technology (BS, MCP); University of Virginia (JD)

Paul Edouard Dans (born 1968/1969) is an American lawyer, political operative, and politician who briefly served as chief of staff to the Office of Personnel Management in President Trump's first administration. A Republican, he is best known for leading Project 2025, the Heritage Foundation's 2025 presidential transition project intended to enact conservative policy through the federal government. Prior to entering politics, Dans was a lawyer.

Dans was a candidate in the 2026 United States Senate election in South Carolina, challenging Lindsey Graham in the Republican primary, before dropping out of the race and endorsing Mark Lynch.

== Early life and education ==
Dans spent his childhood just north of Baltimore, Maryland. He attended Dulaney High School, where he played sports and was on the debate team. Dans received a Bachelor of Science with a major in economics and a Master of City Planning from the Massachusetts Institute of Technology (MIT). At MIT, he played on the lacrosse team and was selected as a CoSIDA Academic All-America athlete. Dans’s thesis focused on the redevelopment of industrial parks, such as the Brooklyn Navy Yard.

Dans worked at architecture and planning firms before attending law school at the University of Virginia (UVA), where he was president of the law school's Federalist Society chapter. During his time at UVA Law, Dans spent one year living and studying law in Paris, where in 1996 he received a certificate in French Law from the University of Paris II Pantheon-Assas. He later practiced law in New York City.

== Career ==
=== Law ===
Following law school, Dans worked at multiple law firms, including LeBoeuf, Lamb, Greene & MacRae for three years, Debevoise & Plimpton for two years, and a third firm where, among other cases, he handled litigation between Yves Saint Laurent’s beauty line and Costco. He then went on to run a solo law practice.

Dans was among the attorneys hired by Chevron to defend the company against a multibillion-dollar lawsuit pertaining to oil pollution in Ecuador. Dans has been credited with proposing that the outtakes of the film Crude, an exposé of Chevron, be subpoenaed to potentially uncover evidence of legal malfeasance by the plaintiff’s lead lawyer, Steven Donziger. The outtakes enabled Chevron to file suit against Donzinger, leading to a court decision that voided a $9.5 billion judgment against the company.

=== Trump administration ===
In 2011, Dans advocated for Donald Trump to run for president, several years before joining the Trump administration in an official capacity.

During the first Trump administration, Dans served as a senior advisor in the Office of Community Planning and Development at the US Department of Housing and Urban Development. In February 2020, Dans was appointed White House liaison and senior adviser to the Director of the U.S. Office of Personnel Management (OPM), where he managed the federal agency in charge of human resources policy for the more than two million federal workers. He then went on to serve as chief of staff to the director of the OPM, working to staff the approximately 4,000 presidential appointees across the federal government. Dans worked closely with John McEntee to remove longtime public servants from government. Dans was hired without the knowledge of Dale Cabaniss, the director of the Office of Personnel Management, who resigned abruptly in 2020.

=== Heritage Foundation ===
Dans is known as the "architect of Project 2025", which he led as director from the political initiative’s launch in April 2022 until August 2024. Dans described the project as "systematically preparing to march into office and bring a new army [of] aligned, trained, and essentially weaponized conservatives ready to do battle against the deep state".

In 2023, Dans stated that Project 2025 had a "great" relationship with President Trump, despite clashing with the 2024 Trump campaign team.

On July 30, 2024, Dans announced he was stepping down from his position as Director of Project 2025 at the Heritage Foundation in the wake of public criticism from President Trump. In a statement, Heritage stated that the decision to part ways was mutual and due to strategic differences, clarifying reports that Dans had been terminated over issues of alleged misconduct. Days before Dans stepped down, he appeared on a podcast run by Tenet Media, a company that was found to have received funding from Russia Today and was ultimately used to promote Russian propaganda.

=== U.S. Senate campaign ===
On July 28, 2025, it was reported that Dans would challenge Lindsey Graham for the South Carolina U.S. Senate seat, which has been held by Graham since 2003.

Media Matters reported that Dans praised the appointment of Stephen Miller as White House Chief of Staff in 2026, telling Matt Gaetz on One America News Network "We have to let young white men take the wheel again of the American economy." Gaetz replied "Yeah, I guess I would quibble at the racialized tinge to that, Paul, because it was young men of every color, every stripe, every background that made up such an essential part of President Trump's coalition."

== Personal life ==
Dans resides in Charleston, South Carolina. He is a fluent French speaker. Dans' father was a professor at Johns Hopkins School of Medicine, and his mother had worked for National Institutes of Health and then became a schoolteacher. Dans has three siblings. His ancestors' roots are in the Catholic faith.

In 2007, Dans married Mary Helen Bowers, founder of Ballet Beautiful and a former New York City Ballet dancer who trained Natalie Portman in preparation for her role in the movie Black Swan. Bowers was appointed to the Kennedy Center's Board of Trustees by President Trump at the end of his first term. Together, she and Dans have four children.

Dans's twin brother, Tom Dans, is a venture capitalist and was an official in Trump's first administration.
