= Mandy Gunasekara =

American environmental attorney

Mandy Gunasekara (née McGrevey) is an American environmental attorney, who served as chief of staff of the Environmental Protection Agency during the first presidency of Donald Trump. A member of the Republican Party, Gunasekara was an advisor to Jim Inhofe during the 114th United States Congress.

Born in Mississippi, Gunasekara completed her Bachelor's degree in Media and Communications at Mississippi College in 2007 and her Juris Doctor degree at the University of Mississippi in 2010.

Gunasekara originally joined the EPA as a policy advisor in 2017. She resigned from the EPA in 2019 to lead a pro-Trump nonprofit in Mississippi until she rejoined the EPA as Chief of Staff in 2020. As Chief of Staff, she sought to make the EPA a conservative institution. In practice, this meant downsizing. Gunasekara claims she was a significant force behind the US leaving the 2015 Paris Climate Agreement. After Trump's first term, she worked at the Heritage Foundation where she helped write the climate section of the guiding document for Project 2025. Gunasekara has stated that she does not desire to return to the EPA as part of Trump's second term, but that she may seek other positions in his administration.

In 2023, Gunasekara ran for the Mississippi Public Services Commission. However, she was disqualified from the role because she did not meet the residency requirements.

In October 2024, Gunasekara published a book titled Y’all Fired: A Southern Belle’s Guide to Restoring Federalism and Draining the Swamp.
