= Project 2029 =

Democrat agenda for a potential Democratic US president in 2029

Project 2029 is a project by Democratic thinkers in the United States to draft an agenda for a potential Democratic president to use upon taking office on January 20, 2029. Named after the similar but conservative Project 2025, it is organized by Andrei Cherny and intends to produce a book from articles published over a two-year span.

In February 2026, it was announced that Chad Maisel was leading the project. Maisel was previously a special assistant to President Biden on the White House Domestic Policy Council as well as a policy advisor to Senator Cory Booker. As of September 2026, Project 2029 has released three proposals: Child Care Choice Guarantee, Crack Down on the Annoyance Economy, and Kids Over Clicks.

Reason described Kids Over Clicks as including narrower Section 230 protections, a ban on social media accounts for children under 16, and requirements for "safer internet platforms". Bloomberg reported that under the Child Care Choice Guarantee Proposal, "the federal government would offer families two choices for each young child under 5: a free public daycare slot, or a stipend of $1,000 per month, meant to offset the costs or lost income associated with parent- or relative-provided care." NPR's Planet Money reported that Crack Down on the Annoyance Economy — co-authored by Maisel and economist Neale Mahoney — proposed measures including "click-to-cancel" rules for subscriptions, expanded junk-fee disclosure requirements, restrictions on prior-authorization requirements in health insurance, and new enforcement measures against robocalls and scam texts.
