= Mary Helen Bowers =

American ballet dancer and author (born 1979)

- Born: 1979 (age 46–47); Charlotte, North Carolina, U.S.
- Education: Columbia University (BA)
- Occupations: Dancer, fitness professional, author
- Years active: 1995–present
- Known for: Black Swan, Ballet Beautiful
- Spouse: Paul Dans (m. 2007)
- Children: 4
- Website: Official site

Mary Helen Bowers (born 1979) is an American celebrity fitness guru, entrepreneur and former New York City Ballet dancer originally from Charlotte, North Carolina. She was named a Kennedy Center trustee in January 2025.

== Early life and education ==
Bowers attended Alexander Graham Middle School in Charlotte, North Carolina, before leaving for New York, where she was a full scholarship student at the School of American Ballet in Manhattan at fifteen years old. One year later she was invited to join the New York City Ballet. She graduated with a Bachelor of Arts degree in English literature from Columbia University in New York City. She danced with the New York City Ballet for a decade.

Bowers founded Ballet Beautiful in 2008.

On June 12, 2012, she released her book, Ballet Beautiful: Transform Your Body and Gain the Strength, Grace, and Focus of a Ballet Dancer. Her list of clients include Natalie Portman, Zooey Deschanel and Liv Tyler. Other celebrities include actresses Kirsten Dunst and Dakota Johnson, model Helena Christensen, Karen Elson, Sarah Sophie Flicker and Rachel Antonoff.

Bowers helped train actress Natalie Portman for the Oscar-winning performance in the 2010 movie, Black Swan.

== Personal life ==
She is married to Paul Dans, with whom she has four children.
